

84001–84100 

|-bgcolor=#fefefe
| 84001 ||  || — || July 13, 2002 || Haleakala || NEAT || MAS || align=right | 1.7 km || 
|-id=002 bgcolor=#E9E9E9
| 84002 ||  || — || July 9, 2002 || Socorro || LINEAR || EUN || align=right | 2.6 km || 
|-id=003 bgcolor=#fefefe
| 84003 ||  || — || July 14, 2002 || Socorro || LINEAR || — || align=right | 3.1 km || 
|-id=004 bgcolor=#E9E9E9
| 84004 ||  || — || July 17, 2002 || Socorro || LINEAR || — || align=right | 7.3 km || 
|-id=005 bgcolor=#E9E9E9
| 84005 ||  || — || July 17, 2002 || Socorro || LINEAR || — || align=right | 3.1 km || 
|-id=006 bgcolor=#E9E9E9
| 84006 ||  || — || July 17, 2002 || Socorro || LINEAR || — || align=right | 4.0 km || 
|-id=007 bgcolor=#fefefe
| 84007 ||  || — || July 23, 2002 || Palomar || NEAT || NYS || align=right | 1.5 km || 
|-id=008 bgcolor=#d6d6d6
| 84008 ||  || — || July 18, 2002 || Socorro || LINEAR || LIX || align=right | 7.6 km || 
|-id=009 bgcolor=#fefefe
| 84009 ||  || — || July 31, 2002 || Reedy Creek || J. Broughton || NYS || align=right | 1.3 km || 
|-id=010 bgcolor=#d6d6d6
| 84010 ||  || — || July 28, 2002 || Haleakala || NEAT || — || align=right | 7.5 km || 
|-id=011 bgcolor=#d6d6d6
| 84011 Jean-Claude ||  ||  || July 23, 2002 || Palomar || S. F. Hönig || 3:2 || align=right | 8.4 km || 
|-id=012 bgcolor=#fefefe
| 84012 Deluise || 2002 PR ||  || August 2, 2002 || Campo Imperatore || CINEOS || — || align=right | 1.4 km || 
|-id=013 bgcolor=#d6d6d6
| 84013 ||  || — || August 4, 2002 || Palomar || NEAT || — || align=right | 6.0 km || 
|-id=014 bgcolor=#E9E9E9
| 84014 ||  || — || August 6, 2002 || Palomar || NEAT || HEN || align=right | 3.5 km || 
|-id=015 bgcolor=#fefefe
| 84015 Efthymiopoulos ||  ||  || August 5, 2002 || Campo Imperatore || CINEOS || — || align=right | 1.9 km || 
|-id=016 bgcolor=#E9E9E9
| 84016 ||  || — || August 4, 2002 || Socorro || LINEAR || — || align=right | 3.7 km || 
|-id=017 bgcolor=#E9E9E9
| 84017 ||  || — || August 4, 2002 || Socorro || LINEAR || EUN || align=right | 2.4 km || 
|-id=018 bgcolor=#fefefe
| 84018 ||  || — || August 5, 2002 || Socorro || LINEAR || FLO || align=right | 1.8 km || 
|-id=019 bgcolor=#fefefe
| 84019 ||  || — || August 5, 2002 || Socorro || LINEAR || NYS || align=right | 1.7 km || 
|-id=020 bgcolor=#E9E9E9
| 84020 ||  || — || August 4, 2002 || Socorro || LINEAR || — || align=right | 4.0 km || 
|-id=021 bgcolor=#E9E9E9
| 84021 ||  || — || August 4, 2002 || Socorro || LINEAR || MAR || align=right | 2.6 km || 
|-id=022 bgcolor=#fefefe
| 84022 ||  || — || August 5, 2002 || Socorro || LINEAR || FLO || align=right | 1.7 km || 
|-id=023 bgcolor=#fefefe
| 84023 ||  || — || August 5, 2002 || Socorro || LINEAR || NYS || align=right | 1.6 km || 
|-id=024 bgcolor=#fefefe
| 84024 ||  || — || August 5, 2002 || Socorro || LINEAR || FLO || align=right | 1.6 km || 
|-id=025 bgcolor=#d6d6d6
| 84025 ||  || — || August 5, 2002 || Socorro || LINEAR || — || align=right | 6.0 km || 
|-id=026 bgcolor=#fefefe
| 84026 ||  || — || August 5, 2002 || Socorro || LINEAR || V || align=right | 1.6 km || 
|-id=027 bgcolor=#fefefe
| 84027 ||  || — || August 5, 2002 || Socorro || LINEAR || V || align=right | 1.6 km || 
|-id=028 bgcolor=#E9E9E9
| 84028 ||  || — || August 5, 2002 || Socorro || LINEAR || — || align=right | 5.7 km || 
|-id=029 bgcolor=#fefefe
| 84029 ||  || — || August 5, 2002 || Socorro || LINEAR || — || align=right | 5.0 km || 
|-id=030 bgcolor=#E9E9E9
| 84030 ||  || — || August 5, 2002 || Socorro || LINEAR || GEF || align=right | 3.8 km || 
|-id=031 bgcolor=#E9E9E9
| 84031 ||  || — || August 9, 2002 || Socorro || LINEAR || — || align=right | 4.7 km || 
|-id=032 bgcolor=#E9E9E9
| 84032 ||  || — || August 9, 2002 || Socorro || LINEAR || — || align=right | 2.7 km || 
|-id=033 bgcolor=#fefefe
| 84033 ||  || — || August 9, 2002 || Socorro || LINEAR || NYS || align=right | 1.6 km || 
|-id=034 bgcolor=#E9E9E9
| 84034 ||  || — || August 10, 2002 || Socorro || LINEAR || — || align=right | 5.0 km || 
|-id=035 bgcolor=#d6d6d6
| 84035 ||  || — || August 10, 2002 || Socorro || LINEAR || — || align=right | 4.5 km || 
|-id=036 bgcolor=#fefefe
| 84036 ||  || — || August 10, 2002 || Socorro || LINEAR || NYS || align=right | 1.5 km || 
|-id=037 bgcolor=#fefefe
| 84037 ||  || — || August 10, 2002 || Socorro || LINEAR || NYS || align=right | 1.6 km || 
|-id=038 bgcolor=#fefefe
| 84038 ||  || — || August 10, 2002 || Socorro || LINEAR || — || align=right | 1.6 km || 
|-id=039 bgcolor=#fefefe
| 84039 ||  || — || August 10, 2002 || Socorro || LINEAR || FLO || align=right | 3.8 km || 
|-id=040 bgcolor=#fefefe
| 84040 ||  || — || August 5, 2002 || Socorro || LINEAR || — || align=right | 1.6 km || 
|-id=041 bgcolor=#fefefe
| 84041 ||  || — || August 9, 2002 || Socorro || LINEAR || — || align=right | 1.9 km || 
|-id=042 bgcolor=#fefefe
| 84042 ||  || — || August 9, 2002 || Socorro || LINEAR || V || align=right | 1.3 km || 
|-id=043 bgcolor=#E9E9E9
| 84043 ||  || — || August 9, 2002 || Socorro || LINEAR || EUN || align=right | 2.3 km || 
|-id=044 bgcolor=#E9E9E9
| 84044 ||  || — || August 9, 2002 || Socorro || LINEAR || — || align=right | 4.2 km || 
|-id=045 bgcolor=#fefefe
| 84045 ||  || — || August 10, 2002 || Socorro || LINEAR || MASslow? || align=right | 1.8 km || 
|-id=046 bgcolor=#fefefe
| 84046 ||  || — || August 10, 2002 || Socorro || LINEAR || — || align=right | 2.2 km || 
|-id=047 bgcolor=#fefefe
| 84047 ||  || — || August 10, 2002 || Socorro || LINEAR || — || align=right | 2.2 km || 
|-id=048 bgcolor=#fefefe
| 84048 ||  || — || August 10, 2002 || Socorro || LINEAR || FLO || align=right | 1.4 km || 
|-id=049 bgcolor=#E9E9E9
| 84049 ||  || — || August 10, 2002 || Socorro || LINEAR || — || align=right | 3.1 km || 
|-id=050 bgcolor=#E9E9E9
| 84050 ||  || — || August 10, 2002 || Socorro || LINEAR || — || align=right | 2.4 km || 
|-id=051 bgcolor=#fefefe
| 84051 ||  || — || August 11, 2002 || Palomar || NEAT || NYS || align=right | 1.3 km || 
|-id=052 bgcolor=#E9E9E9
| 84052 ||  || — || August 10, 2002 || Socorro || LINEAR || — || align=right | 7.7 km || 
|-id=053 bgcolor=#fefefe
| 84053 ||  || — || August 12, 2002 || Socorro || LINEAR || — || align=right | 6.1 km || 
|-id=054 bgcolor=#fefefe
| 84054 ||  || — || August 10, 2002 || Socorro || LINEAR || MAS || align=right | 1.8 km || 
|-id=055 bgcolor=#fefefe
| 84055 ||  || — || August 10, 2002 || Socorro || LINEAR || PHO || align=right | 5.7 km || 
|-id=056 bgcolor=#E9E9E9
| 84056 ||  || — || August 13, 2002 || Socorro || LINEAR || — || align=right | 2.1 km || 
|-id=057 bgcolor=#fefefe
| 84057 ||  || — || August 14, 2002 || Palomar || NEAT || H || align=right | 1.3 km || 
|-id=058 bgcolor=#E9E9E9
| 84058 ||  || — || August 12, 2002 || Socorro || LINEAR || — || align=right | 2.9 km || 
|-id=059 bgcolor=#d6d6d6
| 84059 ||  || — || August 12, 2002 || Socorro || LINEAR || ALA || align=right | 7.9 km || 
|-id=060 bgcolor=#E9E9E9
| 84060 ||  || — || August 12, 2002 || Socorro || LINEAR || — || align=right | 1.9 km || 
|-id=061 bgcolor=#E9E9E9
| 84061 ||  || — || August 14, 2002 || Socorro || LINEAR || — || align=right | 2.1 km || 
|-id=062 bgcolor=#E9E9E9
| 84062 ||  || — || August 15, 2002 || Socorro || LINEAR || — || align=right | 3.2 km || 
|-id=063 bgcolor=#E9E9E9
| 84063 ||  || — || August 13, 2002 || Anderson Mesa || LONEOS || DOR || align=right | 5.2 km || 
|-id=064 bgcolor=#fefefe
| 84064 ||  || — || August 14, 2002 || Socorro || LINEAR || — || align=right | 1.8 km || 
|-id=065 bgcolor=#E9E9E9
| 84065 ||  || — || August 14, 2002 || Socorro || LINEAR || — || align=right | 5.0 km || 
|-id=066 bgcolor=#fefefe
| 84066 ||  || — || August 14, 2002 || Socorro || LINEAR || — || align=right | 1.8 km || 
|-id=067 bgcolor=#fefefe
| 84067 ||  || — || August 14, 2002 || Socorro || LINEAR || NYS || align=right | 1.6 km || 
|-id=068 bgcolor=#fefefe
| 84068 ||  || — || August 1, 2002 || Socorro || LINEAR || H || align=right | 1.8 km || 
|-id=069 bgcolor=#fefefe
| 84069 ||  || — || August 1, 2002 || Socorro || LINEAR || H || align=right | 1.2 km || 
|-id=070 bgcolor=#E9E9E9
| 84070 ||  || — || August 12, 2002 || Socorro || LINEAR || HNS || align=right | 2.3 km || 
|-id=071 bgcolor=#fefefe
| 84071 ||  || — || August 8, 2002 || Palomar || NEAT || — || align=right | 1.4 km || 
|-id=072 bgcolor=#E9E9E9
| 84072 ||  || — || August 1, 2002 || Socorro || LINEAR || — || align=right | 3.4 km || 
|-id=073 bgcolor=#E9E9E9
| 84073 ||  || — || August 8, 2002 || Palomar || S. F. Hönig || RAF || align=right | 1.4 km || 
|-id=074 bgcolor=#fefefe
| 84074 ||  || — || August 8, 2002 || Palomar || S. F. Hönig || — || align=right | 2.0 km || 
|-id=075 bgcolor=#d6d6d6
| 84075 Peterpatricia ||  ||  || August 8, 2002 || Palomar || A. Lowe || KAR || align=right | 1.8 km || 
|-id=076 bgcolor=#E9E9E9
| 84076 || 2002 QN || — || August 16, 2002 || Socorro || LINEAR || — || align=right | 6.6 km || 
|-id=077 bgcolor=#fefefe
| 84077 ||  || — || August 16, 2002 || Socorro || LINEAR || V || align=right | 1.3 km || 
|-id=078 bgcolor=#E9E9E9
| 84078 ||  || — || August 16, 2002 || Palomar || NEAT || — || align=right | 1.9 km || 
|-id=079 bgcolor=#fefefe
| 84079 ||  || — || August 16, 2002 || Palomar || NEAT || V || align=right | 1.2 km || 
|-id=080 bgcolor=#E9E9E9
| 84080 ||  || — || August 19, 2002 || Haleakala || NEAT || — || align=right | 3.2 km || 
|-id=081 bgcolor=#E9E9E9
| 84081 ||  || — || August 19, 2002 || Palomar || NEAT || — || align=right | 3.9 km || 
|-id=082 bgcolor=#fefefe
| 84082 ||  || — || August 28, 2002 || Palomar || NEAT || FLO || align=right | 1.4 km || 
|-id=083 bgcolor=#fefefe
| 84083 ||  || — || August 28, 2002 || Palomar || NEAT || MAS || align=right | 1.4 km || 
|-id=084 bgcolor=#fefefe
| 84084 ||  || — || August 26, 2002 || Palomar || NEAT || NYS || align=right | 1.3 km || 
|-id=085 bgcolor=#d6d6d6
| 84085 ||  || — || August 27, 2002 || Socorro || LINEAR || EUP || align=right | 11 km || 
|-id=086 bgcolor=#E9E9E9
| 84086 ||  || — || August 29, 2002 || Palomar || NEAT || — || align=right | 2.7 km || 
|-id=087 bgcolor=#fefefe
| 84087 ||  || — || August 29, 2002 || Palomar || NEAT || — || align=right | 2.1 km || 
|-id=088 bgcolor=#fefefe
| 84088 ||  || — || August 29, 2002 || Palomar || NEAT || FLO || align=right | 1.1 km || 
|-id=089 bgcolor=#fefefe
| 84089 ||  || — || August 30, 2002 || Kitt Peak || Spacewatch || — || align=right | 2.1 km || 
|-id=090 bgcolor=#E9E9E9
| 84090 ||  || — || August 30, 2002 || Palomar || NEAT || — || align=right | 3.4 km || 
|-id=091 bgcolor=#fefefe
| 84091 ||  || — || August 31, 2002 || Anderson Mesa || LONEOS || — || align=right | 3.3 km || 
|-id=092 bgcolor=#fefefe
| 84092 ||  || — || August 31, 2002 || Socorro || LINEAR || — || align=right | 1.9 km || 
|-id=093 bgcolor=#E9E9E9
| 84093 ||  || — || August 27, 2002 || Palomar || NEAT || RAF || align=right | 1.8 km || 
|-id=094 bgcolor=#E9E9E9
| 84094 ||  || — || August 30, 2002 || Socorro || LINEAR || JUN || align=right | 2.8 km || 
|-id=095 bgcolor=#fefefe
| 84095 Davidjohn ||  ||  || August 20, 2002 || Palomar || R. Matson || NYS || align=right | 4.1 km || 
|-id=096 bgcolor=#fefefe
| 84096 Reginaldglenice ||  ||  || August 17, 2002 || Palomar || A. Lowe || — || align=right | 1.4 km || 
|-id=097 bgcolor=#E9E9E9
| 84097 ||  || — || September 4, 2002 || Anderson Mesa || LONEOS || — || align=right | 2.9 km || 
|-id=098 bgcolor=#fefefe
| 84098 ||  || — || September 4, 2002 || Anderson Mesa || LONEOS || — || align=right | 1.7 km || 
|-id=099 bgcolor=#fefefe
| 84099 ||  || — || September 4, 2002 || Anderson Mesa || LONEOS || MAS || align=right | 1.8 km || 
|-id=100 bgcolor=#E9E9E9
| 84100 Farnocchia ||  ||  || September 3, 2002 || Campo Imperatore || CINEOS || — || align=right | 5.3 km || 
|}

84101–84200 

|-bgcolor=#fefefe
| 84101 ||  || — || September 4, 2002 || Palomar || NEAT || NYS || align=right | 1.6 km || 
|-id=102 bgcolor=#fefefe
| 84102 ||  || — || September 4, 2002 || Anderson Mesa || LONEOS || — || align=right | 1.7 km || 
|-id=103 bgcolor=#d6d6d6
| 84103 ||  || — || September 4, 2002 || Anderson Mesa || LONEOS || 3:2 || align=right | 13 km || 
|-id=104 bgcolor=#d6d6d6
| 84104 ||  || — || September 4, 2002 || Anderson Mesa || LONEOS || — || align=right | 6.7 km || 
|-id=105 bgcolor=#fefefe
| 84105 ||  || — || September 4, 2002 || Anderson Mesa || LONEOS || — || align=right | 1.3 km || 
|-id=106 bgcolor=#fefefe
| 84106 ||  || — || September 4, 2002 || Anderson Mesa || LONEOS || NYS || align=right | 1.3 km || 
|-id=107 bgcolor=#fefefe
| 84107 ||  || — || September 4, 2002 || Anderson Mesa || LONEOS || V || align=right | 1.5 km || 
|-id=108 bgcolor=#fefefe
| 84108 ||  || — || September 4, 2002 || Anderson Mesa || LONEOS || NYS || align=right | 1.7 km || 
|-id=109 bgcolor=#fefefe
| 84109 ||  || — || September 4, 2002 || Anderson Mesa || LONEOS || FLO || align=right | 1.4 km || 
|-id=110 bgcolor=#E9E9E9
| 84110 ||  || — || September 4, 2002 || Anderson Mesa || LONEOS || GEF || align=right | 2.2 km || 
|-id=111 bgcolor=#fefefe
| 84111 ||  || — || September 4, 2002 || Anderson Mesa || LONEOS || — || align=right | 1.8 km || 
|-id=112 bgcolor=#fefefe
| 84112 ||  || — || September 4, 2002 || Anderson Mesa || LONEOS || — || align=right | 1.8 km || 
|-id=113 bgcolor=#fefefe
| 84113 ||  || — || September 4, 2002 || Anderson Mesa || LONEOS || NYS || align=right | 1.2 km || 
|-id=114 bgcolor=#E9E9E9
| 84114 ||  || — || September 4, 2002 || Anderson Mesa || LONEOS || — || align=right | 4.0 km || 
|-id=115 bgcolor=#E9E9E9
| 84115 ||  || — || September 4, 2002 || Anderson Mesa || LONEOS || — || align=right | 1.9 km || 
|-id=116 bgcolor=#E9E9E9
| 84116 ||  || — || September 4, 2002 || Anderson Mesa || LONEOS || VIB || align=right | 4.8 km || 
|-id=117 bgcolor=#E9E9E9
| 84117 ||  || — || September 3, 2002 || Haleakala || NEAT || — || align=right | 3.9 km || 
|-id=118 bgcolor=#fefefe
| 84118 Bracalicioci ||  ||  || September 3, 2002 || Campo Imperatore || F. Bernardi || — || align=right | 2.1 km || 
|-id=119 bgcolor=#E9E9E9
| 84119 Sanitariitaliani ||  ||  || September 3, 2002 || Campo Imperatore || F. Bernardi || — || align=right | 3.7 km || 
|-id=120 bgcolor=#E9E9E9
| 84120 Antonacci ||  ||  || September 4, 2002 || Campo Imperatore || F. Bernardi, M. Tombelli || EUN || align=right | 2.3 km || 
|-id=121 bgcolor=#E9E9E9
| 84121 ||  || — || September 5, 2002 || Socorro || LINEAR || — || align=right | 3.0 km || 
|-id=122 bgcolor=#fefefe
| 84122 ||  || — || September 4, 2002 || Anderson Mesa || LONEOS || ERI || align=right | 3.2 km || 
|-id=123 bgcolor=#fefefe
| 84123 ||  || — || September 4, 2002 || Anderson Mesa || LONEOS || — || align=right | 1.4 km || 
|-id=124 bgcolor=#fefefe
| 84124 ||  || — || September 4, 2002 || Anderson Mesa || LONEOS || V || align=right | 1.2 km || 
|-id=125 bgcolor=#E9E9E9
| 84125 ||  || — || September 4, 2002 || Anderson Mesa || LONEOS || — || align=right | 8.2 km || 
|-id=126 bgcolor=#E9E9E9
| 84126 ||  || — || September 5, 2002 || Socorro || LINEAR || — || align=right | 4.9 km || 
|-id=127 bgcolor=#E9E9E9
| 84127 ||  || — || September 5, 2002 || Socorro || LINEAR || — || align=right | 3.3 km || 
|-id=128 bgcolor=#d6d6d6
| 84128 ||  || — || September 5, 2002 || Socorro || LINEAR || — || align=right | 6.3 km || 
|-id=129 bgcolor=#fefefe
| 84129 ||  || — || September 5, 2002 || Socorro || LINEAR || — || align=right | 1.9 km || 
|-id=130 bgcolor=#d6d6d6
| 84130 ||  || — || September 5, 2002 || Socorro || LINEAR || HYG || align=right | 6.8 km || 
|-id=131 bgcolor=#E9E9E9
| 84131 ||  || — || September 5, 2002 || Socorro || LINEAR || — || align=right | 4.9 km || 
|-id=132 bgcolor=#fefefe
| 84132 ||  || — || September 5, 2002 || Socorro || LINEAR || — || align=right | 1.8 km || 
|-id=133 bgcolor=#E9E9E9
| 84133 ||  || — || September 5, 2002 || Socorro || LINEAR || — || align=right | 3.5 km || 
|-id=134 bgcolor=#fefefe
| 84134 ||  || — || September 5, 2002 || Socorro || LINEAR || — || align=right | 2.2 km || 
|-id=135 bgcolor=#d6d6d6
| 84135 ||  || — || September 5, 2002 || Socorro || LINEAR || — || align=right | 8.1 km || 
|-id=136 bgcolor=#E9E9E9
| 84136 ||  || — || September 5, 2002 || Socorro || LINEAR || AGN || align=right | 2.8 km || 
|-id=137 bgcolor=#E9E9E9
| 84137 ||  || — || September 5, 2002 || Socorro || LINEAR || — || align=right | 1.9 km || 
|-id=138 bgcolor=#E9E9E9
| 84138 ||  || — || September 5, 2002 || Socorro || LINEAR || — || align=right | 4.5 km || 
|-id=139 bgcolor=#E9E9E9
| 84139 ||  || — || September 5, 2002 || Socorro || LINEAR || — || align=right | 2.4 km || 
|-id=140 bgcolor=#E9E9E9
| 84140 ||  || — || September 5, 2002 || Anderson Mesa || LONEOS || ADE || align=right | 5.3 km || 
|-id=141 bgcolor=#fefefe
| 84141 ||  || — || September 5, 2002 || Anderson Mesa || LONEOS || FLO || align=right | 5.1 km || 
|-id=142 bgcolor=#d6d6d6
| 84142 ||  || — || September 5, 2002 || Socorro || LINEAR || — || align=right | 7.9 km || 
|-id=143 bgcolor=#fefefe
| 84143 ||  || — || September 5, 2002 || Socorro || LINEAR || V || align=right | 1.6 km || 
|-id=144 bgcolor=#E9E9E9
| 84144 ||  || — || September 5, 2002 || Socorro || LINEAR || — || align=right | 1.8 km || 
|-id=145 bgcolor=#E9E9E9
| 84145 ||  || — || September 5, 2002 || Socorro || LINEAR || — || align=right | 2.3 km || 
|-id=146 bgcolor=#fefefe
| 84146 ||  || — || September 5, 2002 || Socorro || LINEAR || — || align=right | 4.4 km || 
|-id=147 bgcolor=#E9E9E9
| 84147 ||  || — || September 5, 2002 || Socorro || LINEAR || — || align=right | 3.7 km || 
|-id=148 bgcolor=#fefefe
| 84148 ||  || — || September 5, 2002 || Socorro || LINEAR || — || align=right | 1.9 km || 
|-id=149 bgcolor=#E9E9E9
| 84149 ||  || — || September 5, 2002 || Socorro || LINEAR || MRX || align=right | 2.2 km || 
|-id=150 bgcolor=#fefefe
| 84150 ||  || — || September 4, 2002 || Anderson Mesa || LONEOS || V || align=right | 1.7 km || 
|-id=151 bgcolor=#fefefe
| 84151 ||  || — || September 5, 2002 || Socorro || LINEAR || — || align=right | 1.2 km || 
|-id=152 bgcolor=#fefefe
| 84152 ||  || — || September 5, 2002 || Socorro || LINEAR || MAS || align=right | 1.5 km || 
|-id=153 bgcolor=#E9E9E9
| 84153 ||  || — || September 5, 2002 || Socorro || LINEAR || EUN || align=right | 2.3 km || 
|-id=154 bgcolor=#fefefe
| 84154 ||  || — || September 5, 2002 || Socorro || LINEAR || MAS || align=right | 1.7 km || 
|-id=155 bgcolor=#fefefe
| 84155 ||  || — || September 5, 2002 || Socorro || LINEAR || V || align=right | 1.4 km || 
|-id=156 bgcolor=#d6d6d6
| 84156 ||  || — || September 5, 2002 || Socorro || LINEAR || — || align=right | 5.6 km || 
|-id=157 bgcolor=#fefefe
| 84157 ||  || — || September 5, 2002 || Socorro || LINEAR || — || align=right | 1.9 km || 
|-id=158 bgcolor=#d6d6d6
| 84158 ||  || — || September 5, 2002 || Socorro || LINEAR || — || align=right | 4.8 km || 
|-id=159 bgcolor=#fefefe
| 84159 ||  || — || September 5, 2002 || Socorro || LINEAR || — || align=right | 1.6 km || 
|-id=160 bgcolor=#E9E9E9
| 84160 ||  || — || September 5, 2002 || Socorro || LINEAR || GEF || align=right | 2.8 km || 
|-id=161 bgcolor=#fefefe
| 84161 ||  || — || September 5, 2002 || Socorro || LINEAR || — || align=right | 1.3 km || 
|-id=162 bgcolor=#E9E9E9
| 84162 ||  || — || September 5, 2002 || Socorro || LINEAR || HNS || align=right | 1.9 km || 
|-id=163 bgcolor=#E9E9E9
| 84163 ||  || — || September 5, 2002 || Anderson Mesa || LONEOS || — || align=right | 2.4 km || 
|-id=164 bgcolor=#E9E9E9
| 84164 ||  || — || September 5, 2002 || Anderson Mesa || LONEOS || — || align=right | 3.9 km || 
|-id=165 bgcolor=#fefefe
| 84165 ||  || — || September 5, 2002 || Socorro || LINEAR || V || align=right | 1.4 km || 
|-id=166 bgcolor=#fefefe
| 84166 ||  || — || September 5, 2002 || Socorro || LINEAR || — || align=right | 1.4 km || 
|-id=167 bgcolor=#fefefe
| 84167 ||  || — || September 5, 2002 || Socorro || LINEAR || — || align=right | 1.6 km || 
|-id=168 bgcolor=#fefefe
| 84168 ||  || — || September 5, 2002 || Socorro || LINEAR || — || align=right | 1.8 km || 
|-id=169 bgcolor=#fefefe
| 84169 ||  || — || September 5, 2002 || Socorro || LINEAR || H || align=right | 1.8 km || 
|-id=170 bgcolor=#fefefe
| 84170 ||  || — || September 5, 2002 || Socorro || LINEAR || V || align=right | 1.7 km || 
|-id=171 bgcolor=#fefefe
| 84171 ||  || — || September 5, 2002 || Socorro || LINEAR || — || align=right | 1.8 km || 
|-id=172 bgcolor=#E9E9E9
| 84172 ||  || — || September 5, 2002 || Socorro || LINEAR || — || align=right | 2.3 km || 
|-id=173 bgcolor=#d6d6d6
| 84173 ||  || — || September 5, 2002 || Socorro || LINEAR || — || align=right | 6.0 km || 
|-id=174 bgcolor=#E9E9E9
| 84174 ||  || — || September 5, 2002 || Socorro || LINEAR || — || align=right | 3.2 km || 
|-id=175 bgcolor=#fefefe
| 84175 ||  || — || September 5, 2002 || Socorro || LINEAR || — || align=right | 1.7 km || 
|-id=176 bgcolor=#E9E9E9
| 84176 ||  || — || September 5, 2002 || Socorro || LINEAR || — || align=right | 2.0 km || 
|-id=177 bgcolor=#fefefe
| 84177 ||  || — || September 5, 2002 || Socorro || LINEAR || V || align=right | 1.4 km || 
|-id=178 bgcolor=#d6d6d6
| 84178 ||  || — || September 5, 2002 || Socorro || LINEAR || — || align=right | 5.5 km || 
|-id=179 bgcolor=#E9E9E9
| 84179 ||  || — || September 5, 2002 || Socorro || LINEAR || — || align=right | 5.9 km || 
|-id=180 bgcolor=#fefefe
| 84180 ||  || — || September 5, 2002 || Socorro || LINEAR || FLO || align=right | 1.8 km || 
|-id=181 bgcolor=#E9E9E9
| 84181 ||  || — || September 5, 2002 || Socorro || LINEAR || — || align=right | 6.0 km || 
|-id=182 bgcolor=#E9E9E9
| 84182 ||  || — || September 5, 2002 || Socorro || LINEAR || — || align=right | 4.9 km || 
|-id=183 bgcolor=#E9E9E9
| 84183 ||  || — || September 5, 2002 || Socorro || LINEAR || DOR || align=right | 6.7 km || 
|-id=184 bgcolor=#E9E9E9
| 84184 ||  || — || September 5, 2002 || Socorro || LINEAR || — || align=right | 2.9 km || 
|-id=185 bgcolor=#d6d6d6
| 84185 ||  || — || September 5, 2002 || Socorro || LINEAR || MEL || align=right | 12 km || 
|-id=186 bgcolor=#E9E9E9
| 84186 ||  || — || September 5, 2002 || Socorro || LINEAR || — || align=right | 2.5 km || 
|-id=187 bgcolor=#E9E9E9
| 84187 ||  || — || September 5, 2002 || Socorro || LINEAR || — || align=right | 2.2 km || 
|-id=188 bgcolor=#E9E9E9
| 84188 ||  || — || September 5, 2002 || Socorro || LINEAR || — || align=right | 3.7 km || 
|-id=189 bgcolor=#E9E9E9
| 84189 ||  || — || September 5, 2002 || Socorro || LINEAR || — || align=right | 3.7 km || 
|-id=190 bgcolor=#fefefe
| 84190 ||  || — || September 6, 2002 || Socorro || LINEAR || V || align=right | 1.2 km || 
|-id=191 bgcolor=#fefefe
| 84191 ||  || — || September 6, 2002 || Socorro || LINEAR || FLO || align=right | 1.5 km || 
|-id=192 bgcolor=#d6d6d6
| 84192 ||  || — || September 5, 2002 || Socorro || LINEAR || — || align=right | 3.7 km || 
|-id=193 bgcolor=#fefefe
| 84193 ||  || — || September 5, 2002 || Socorro || LINEAR || — || align=right | 1.4 km || 
|-id=194 bgcolor=#fefefe
| 84194 ||  || — || September 7, 2002 || Socorro || LINEAR || V || align=right | 1.6 km || 
|-id=195 bgcolor=#fefefe
| 84195 ||  || — || September 7, 2002 || Socorro || LINEAR || — || align=right | 2.0 km || 
|-id=196 bgcolor=#E9E9E9
| 84196 ||  || — || September 2, 2002 || Kvistaberg || UDAS || — || align=right | 4.2 km || 
|-id=197 bgcolor=#E9E9E9
| 84197 ||  || — || September 5, 2002 || Haleakala || NEAT || — || align=right | 6.2 km || 
|-id=198 bgcolor=#fefefe
| 84198 ||  || — || September 5, 2002 || Socorro || LINEAR || NYS || align=right | 1.2 km || 
|-id=199 bgcolor=#fefefe
| 84199 ||  || — || September 8, 2002 || Haleakala || NEAT || — || align=right | 1.5 km || 
|-id=200 bgcolor=#d6d6d6
| 84200 Robertmoore ||  ||  || September 8, 2002 || Haleakala || NEAT || — || align=right | 8.0 km || 
|}

84201–84300 

|-bgcolor=#E9E9E9
| 84201 ||  || — || September 7, 2002 || Socorro || LINEAR || RAF || align=right | 2.9 km || 
|-id=202 bgcolor=#E9E9E9
| 84202 ||  || — || September 10, 2002 || Palomar || NEAT || HNS || align=right | 2.8 km || 
|-id=203 bgcolor=#fefefe
| 84203 ||  || — || September 9, 2002 || Haleakala || NEAT || H || align=right | 1.4 km || 
|-id=204 bgcolor=#E9E9E9
| 84204 ||  || — || September 10, 2002 || Palomar || NEAT || — || align=right | 1.9 km || 
|-id=205 bgcolor=#fefefe
| 84205 ||  || — || September 10, 2002 || Haleakala || NEAT || — || align=right | 1.5 km || 
|-id=206 bgcolor=#fefefe
| 84206 ||  || — || September 11, 2002 || Haleakala || NEAT || V || align=right | 1.4 km || 
|-id=207 bgcolor=#fefefe
| 84207 ||  || — || September 10, 2002 || Haleakala || NEAT || — || align=right | 5.4 km || 
|-id=208 bgcolor=#E9E9E9
| 84208 ||  || — || September 10, 2002 || Palomar || NEAT || — || align=right | 2.2 km || 
|-id=209 bgcolor=#E9E9E9
| 84209 ||  || — || September 10, 2002 || Palomar || NEAT || — || align=right | 3.2 km || 
|-id=210 bgcolor=#E9E9E9
| 84210 ||  || — || September 10, 2002 || Palomar || NEAT || — || align=right | 5.8 km || 
|-id=211 bgcolor=#fefefe
| 84211 ||  || — || September 10, 2002 || Haleakala || NEAT || SUL || align=right | 4.0 km || 
|-id=212 bgcolor=#fefefe
| 84212 ||  || — || September 11, 2002 || Haleakala || NEAT || — || align=right | 2.2 km || 
|-id=213 bgcolor=#fefefe
| 84213 ||  || — || September 13, 2002 || Palomar || NEAT || — || align=right | 1.8 km || 
|-id=214 bgcolor=#d6d6d6
| 84214 ||  || — || September 13, 2002 || Palomar || NEAT || — || align=right | 5.5 km || 
|-id=215 bgcolor=#d6d6d6
| 84215 ||  || — || September 13, 2002 || Palomar || NEAT || — || align=right | 8.4 km || 
|-id=216 bgcolor=#E9E9E9
| 84216 ||  || — || September 14, 2002 || Kitt Peak || Spacewatch || — || align=right | 1.6 km || 
|-id=217 bgcolor=#d6d6d6
| 84217 ||  || — || September 14, 2002 || Kitt Peak || Spacewatch || — || align=right | 5.1 km || 
|-id=218 bgcolor=#fefefe
| 84218 ||  || — || September 14, 2002 || Kitt Peak || Spacewatch || CLA || align=right | 3.0 km || 
|-id=219 bgcolor=#E9E9E9
| 84219 ||  || — || September 12, 2002 || Palomar || NEAT || — || align=right | 5.4 km || 
|-id=220 bgcolor=#d6d6d6
| 84220 ||  || — || September 12, 2002 || Palomar || NEAT || THM || align=right | 5.8 km || 
|-id=221 bgcolor=#E9E9E9
| 84221 ||  || — || September 13, 2002 || Socorro || LINEAR || — || align=right | 2.2 km || 
|-id=222 bgcolor=#E9E9E9
| 84222 ||  || — || September 15, 2002 || Anderson Mesa || LONEOS || — || align=right | 4.2 km || 
|-id=223 bgcolor=#E9E9E9
| 84223 ||  || — || September 13, 2002 || Haleakala || NEAT || — || align=right | 3.1 km || 
|-id=224 bgcolor=#fefefe
| 84224 Kyte ||  ||  || September 9, 2002 || Haleakala || R. Matson || FLO || align=right | 1.2 km || 
|-id=225 bgcolor=#fefefe
| 84225 Verish ||  ||  || September 12, 2002 || Palomar || R. Matson || — || align=right | 1.4 km || 
|-id=226 bgcolor=#fefefe
| 84226 ||  || — || September 27, 2002 || Palomar || NEAT || V || align=right | 1.3 km || 
|-id=227 bgcolor=#fefefe
| 84227 ||  || — || September 27, 2002 || Palomar || NEAT || NYS || align=right | 1.1 km || 
|-id=228 bgcolor=#fefefe
| 84228 ||  || — || September 27, 2002 || Palomar || NEAT || — || align=right | 1.1 km || 
|-id=229 bgcolor=#fefefe
| 84229 ||  || — || September 27, 2002 || Palomar || NEAT || CIM || align=right | 4.4 km || 
|-id=230 bgcolor=#d6d6d6
| 84230 ||  || — || September 27, 2002 || Palomar || NEAT || THM || align=right | 5.5 km || 
|-id=231 bgcolor=#E9E9E9
| 84231 ||  || — || September 27, 2002 || Socorro || LINEAR || — || align=right | 3.9 km || 
|-id=232 bgcolor=#d6d6d6
| 84232 ||  || — || September 26, 2002 || Palomar || NEAT || HYG || align=right | 6.0 km || 
|-id=233 bgcolor=#fefefe
| 84233 ||  || — || September 27, 2002 || Palomar || NEAT || V || align=right | 1.1 km || 
|-id=234 bgcolor=#E9E9E9
| 84234 ||  || — || September 28, 2002 || Palomar || NEAT || — || align=right | 4.2 km || 
|-id=235 bgcolor=#E9E9E9
| 84235 ||  || — || September 28, 2002 || Haleakala || NEAT || — || align=right | 3.6 km || 
|-id=236 bgcolor=#E9E9E9
| 84236 ||  || — || September 29, 2002 || Haleakala || NEAT || — || align=right | 1.8 km || 
|-id=237 bgcolor=#fefefe
| 84237 ||  || — || September 28, 2002 || Haleakala || NEAT || — || align=right | 1.3 km || 
|-id=238 bgcolor=#fefefe
| 84238 ||  || — || September 28, 2002 || Haleakala || NEAT || V || align=right | 1.5 km || 
|-id=239 bgcolor=#d6d6d6
| 84239 ||  || — || September 28, 2002 || Haleakala || NEAT || — || align=right | 5.5 km || 
|-id=240 bgcolor=#fefefe
| 84240 ||  || — || September 28, 2002 || Haleakala || NEAT || — || align=right | 1.8 km || 
|-id=241 bgcolor=#E9E9E9
| 84241 ||  || — || September 28, 2002 || Haleakala || NEAT || MRX || align=right | 2.9 km || 
|-id=242 bgcolor=#E9E9E9
| 84242 ||  || — || September 29, 2002 || Haleakala || NEAT || — || align=right | 1.4 km || 
|-id=243 bgcolor=#E9E9E9
| 84243 ||  || — || September 29, 2002 || Haleakala || NEAT || — || align=right | 1.6 km || 
|-id=244 bgcolor=#fefefe
| 84244 ||  || — || September 29, 2002 || Haleakala || NEAT || V || align=right | 1.2 km || 
|-id=245 bgcolor=#fefefe
| 84245 ||  || — || September 29, 2002 || Haleakala || NEAT || FLO || align=right | 1.4 km || 
|-id=246 bgcolor=#fefefe
| 84246 ||  || — || September 29, 2002 || Haleakala || NEAT || — || align=right | 1.7 km || 
|-id=247 bgcolor=#E9E9E9
| 84247 ||  || — || September 29, 2002 || Haleakala || NEAT || — || align=right | 2.5 km || 
|-id=248 bgcolor=#fefefe
| 84248 ||  || — || September 29, 2002 || Haleakala || NEAT || — || align=right | 2.2 km || 
|-id=249 bgcolor=#E9E9E9
| 84249 ||  || — || September 29, 2002 || Haleakala || NEAT || — || align=right | 2.9 km || 
|-id=250 bgcolor=#E9E9E9
| 84250 ||  || — || September 29, 2002 || Kitt Peak || Spacewatch || — || align=right | 4.4 km || 
|-id=251 bgcolor=#E9E9E9
| 84251 ||  || — || September 29, 2002 || Haleakala || NEAT || MIS || align=right | 5.9 km || 
|-id=252 bgcolor=#E9E9E9
| 84252 ||  || — || September 30, 2002 || Socorro || LINEAR || — || align=right | 5.7 km || 
|-id=253 bgcolor=#fefefe
| 84253 ||  || — || September 28, 2002 || Palomar || NEAT || FLO || align=right | 1.1 km || 
|-id=254 bgcolor=#d6d6d6
| 84254 ||  || — || September 28, 2002 || Palomar || NEAT || — || align=right | 5.1 km || 
|-id=255 bgcolor=#E9E9E9
| 84255 ||  || — || September 29, 2002 || Haleakala || NEAT || XIZ || align=right | 2.3 km || 
|-id=256 bgcolor=#fefefe
| 84256 ||  || — || September 29, 2002 || Kitt Peak || Spacewatch || — || align=right | 1.6 km || 
|-id=257 bgcolor=#fefefe
| 84257 ||  || — || September 29, 2002 || Kitt Peak || Spacewatch || — || align=right | 1.6 km || 
|-id=258 bgcolor=#d6d6d6
| 84258 ||  || — || September 29, 2002 || Kitt Peak || Spacewatch || KOR || align=right | 3.3 km || 
|-id=259 bgcolor=#d6d6d6
| 84259 ||  || — || September 29, 2002 || Haleakala || NEAT || EOS || align=right | 4.1 km || 
|-id=260 bgcolor=#E9E9E9
| 84260 ||  || — || September 30, 2002 || Haleakala || NEAT || — || align=right | 3.0 km || 
|-id=261 bgcolor=#E9E9E9
| 84261 ||  || — || September 16, 2002 || Haleakala || NEAT || — || align=right | 9.1 km || 
|-id=262 bgcolor=#fefefe
| 84262 ||  || — || September 30, 2002 || Socorro || LINEAR || — || align=right | 1.8 km || 
|-id=263 bgcolor=#fefefe
| 84263 ||  || — || October 1, 2002 || Socorro || LINEAR || — || align=right | 1.7 km || 
|-id=264 bgcolor=#d6d6d6
| 84264 ||  || — || October 1, 2002 || Socorro || LINEAR || EOS || align=right | 7.8 km || 
|-id=265 bgcolor=#fefefe
| 84265 ||  || — || October 1, 2002 || Anderson Mesa || LONEOS || — || align=right | 1.6 km || 
|-id=266 bgcolor=#fefefe
| 84266 ||  || — || October 1, 2002 || Anderson Mesa || LONEOS || — || align=right | 1.4 km || 
|-id=267 bgcolor=#E9E9E9
| 84267 ||  || — || October 1, 2002 || Socorro || LINEAR || — || align=right | 5.2 km || 
|-id=268 bgcolor=#fefefe
| 84268 ||  || — || October 1, 2002 || Haleakala || NEAT || NYS || align=right | 1.6 km || 
|-id=269 bgcolor=#d6d6d6
| 84269 ||  || — || October 1, 2002 || Haleakala || NEAT || — || align=right | 4.2 km || 
|-id=270 bgcolor=#d6d6d6
| 84270 ||  || — || October 1, 2002 || Haleakala || NEAT || — || align=right | 4.1 km || 
|-id=271 bgcolor=#d6d6d6
| 84271 ||  || — || October 1, 2002 || Haleakala || NEAT || — || align=right | 4.6 km || 
|-id=272 bgcolor=#E9E9E9
| 84272 ||  || — || October 2, 2002 || Socorro || LINEAR || — || align=right | 4.7 km || 
|-id=273 bgcolor=#E9E9E9
| 84273 ||  || — || October 1, 2002 || Anderson Mesa || LONEOS || — || align=right | 2.2 km || 
|-id=274 bgcolor=#fefefe
| 84274 ||  || — || October 1, 2002 || Socorro || LINEAR || — || align=right | 3.2 km || 
|-id=275 bgcolor=#d6d6d6
| 84275 ||  || — || October 1, 2002 || Socorro || LINEAR || — || align=right | 7.5 km || 
|-id=276 bgcolor=#E9E9E9
| 84276 ||  || — || October 2, 2002 || Socorro || LINEAR || — || align=right | 2.1 km || 
|-id=277 bgcolor=#E9E9E9
| 84277 ||  || — || October 2, 2002 || Socorro || LINEAR || — || align=right | 4.1 km || 
|-id=278 bgcolor=#d6d6d6
| 84278 ||  || — || October 2, 2002 || Socorro || LINEAR || EOS || align=right | 3.5 km || 
|-id=279 bgcolor=#fefefe
| 84279 ||  || — || October 2, 2002 || Socorro || LINEAR || — || align=right | 1.6 km || 
|-id=280 bgcolor=#d6d6d6
| 84280 ||  || — || October 2, 2002 || Socorro || LINEAR || — || align=right | 5.1 km || 
|-id=281 bgcolor=#E9E9E9
| 84281 ||  || — || October 2, 2002 || Socorro || LINEAR || — || align=right | 1.3 km || 
|-id=282 bgcolor=#fefefe
| 84282 ||  || — || October 2, 2002 || Socorro || LINEAR || — || align=right | 1.8 km || 
|-id=283 bgcolor=#fefefe
| 84283 ||  || — || October 2, 2002 || Socorro || LINEAR || NYS || align=right | 1.3 km || 
|-id=284 bgcolor=#E9E9E9
| 84284 ||  || — || October 2, 2002 || Socorro || LINEAR || — || align=right | 2.2 km || 
|-id=285 bgcolor=#d6d6d6
| 84285 ||  || — || October 2, 2002 || Socorro || LINEAR || KOR || align=right | 3.0 km || 
|-id=286 bgcolor=#E9E9E9
| 84286 ||  || — || October 2, 2002 || Socorro || LINEAR || — || align=right | 4.7 km || 
|-id=287 bgcolor=#d6d6d6
| 84287 ||  || — || October 2, 2002 || Socorro || LINEAR || BRA || align=right | 3.4 km || 
|-id=288 bgcolor=#fefefe
| 84288 ||  || — || October 2, 2002 || Socorro || LINEAR || NYS || align=right | 1.7 km || 
|-id=289 bgcolor=#d6d6d6
| 84289 ||  || — || October 2, 2002 || Socorro || LINEAR || EOS || align=right | 4.0 km || 
|-id=290 bgcolor=#E9E9E9
| 84290 ||  || — || October 2, 2002 || Socorro || LINEAR || — || align=right | 5.2 km || 
|-id=291 bgcolor=#fefefe
| 84291 ||  || — || October 2, 2002 || Socorro || LINEAR || MAS || align=right | 1.4 km || 
|-id=292 bgcolor=#fefefe
| 84292 ||  || — || October 2, 2002 || Socorro || LINEAR || FLO || align=right | 1.6 km || 
|-id=293 bgcolor=#fefefe
| 84293 ||  || — || October 2, 2002 || Socorro || LINEAR || MAS || align=right | 1.4 km || 
|-id=294 bgcolor=#E9E9E9
| 84294 ||  || — || October 2, 2002 || Socorro || LINEAR || AGN || align=right | 2.0 km || 
|-id=295 bgcolor=#fefefe
| 84295 ||  || — || October 2, 2002 || Socorro || LINEAR || — || align=right | 1.6 km || 
|-id=296 bgcolor=#E9E9E9
| 84296 ||  || — || October 2, 2002 || Socorro || LINEAR || — || align=right | 2.2 km || 
|-id=297 bgcolor=#d6d6d6
| 84297 ||  || — || October 2, 2002 || Socorro || LINEAR || HYG || align=right | 6.1 km || 
|-id=298 bgcolor=#E9E9E9
| 84298 ||  || — || October 2, 2002 || Socorro || LINEAR || PAD || align=right | 6.2 km || 
|-id=299 bgcolor=#d6d6d6
| 84299 ||  || — || October 2, 2002 || Socorro || LINEAR || — || align=right | 5.5 km || 
|-id=300 bgcolor=#E9E9E9
| 84300 ||  || — || October 2, 2002 || Socorro || LINEAR || WIT || align=right | 2.9 km || 
|}

84301–84400 

|-bgcolor=#fefefe
| 84301 ||  || — || October 2, 2002 || Socorro || LINEAR || — || align=right | 1.7 km || 
|-id=302 bgcolor=#E9E9E9
| 84302 ||  || — || October 2, 2002 || Socorro || LINEAR || — || align=right | 3.2 km || 
|-id=303 bgcolor=#fefefe
| 84303 ||  || — || October 2, 2002 || Socorro || LINEAR || V || align=right | 1.7 km || 
|-id=304 bgcolor=#d6d6d6
| 84304 ||  || — || October 2, 2002 || Socorro || LINEAR || — || align=right | 4.8 km || 
|-id=305 bgcolor=#E9E9E9
| 84305 ||  || — || October 2, 2002 || Socorro || LINEAR || — || align=right | 3.4 km || 
|-id=306 bgcolor=#d6d6d6
| 84306 ||  || — || October 2, 2002 || Socorro || LINEAR || — || align=right | 6.0 km || 
|-id=307 bgcolor=#fefefe
| 84307 ||  || — || October 2, 2002 || Socorro || LINEAR || FLO || align=right | 1.7 km || 
|-id=308 bgcolor=#fefefe
| 84308 ||  || — || October 2, 2002 || Socorro || LINEAR || V || align=right | 1.5 km || 
|-id=309 bgcolor=#E9E9E9
| 84309 ||  || — || October 2, 2002 || Socorro || LINEAR || — || align=right | 2.6 km || 
|-id=310 bgcolor=#E9E9E9
| 84310 ||  || — || October 2, 2002 || Socorro || LINEAR || — || align=right | 3.6 km || 
|-id=311 bgcolor=#fefefe
| 84311 ||  || — || October 2, 2002 || Socorro || LINEAR || — || align=right | 2.4 km || 
|-id=312 bgcolor=#E9E9E9
| 84312 ||  || — || October 2, 2002 || Socorro || LINEAR || — || align=right | 3.8 km || 
|-id=313 bgcolor=#E9E9E9
| 84313 ||  || — || October 2, 2002 || Socorro || LINEAR || — || align=right | 4.1 km || 
|-id=314 bgcolor=#fefefe
| 84314 ||  || — || October 2, 2002 || Socorro || LINEAR || — || align=right | 1.6 km || 
|-id=315 bgcolor=#E9E9E9
| 84315 ||  || — || October 2, 2002 || Socorro || LINEAR || — || align=right | 5.5 km || 
|-id=316 bgcolor=#d6d6d6
| 84316 ||  || — || October 2, 2002 || Socorro || LINEAR || THM || align=right | 5.5 km || 
|-id=317 bgcolor=#E9E9E9
| 84317 ||  || — || October 2, 2002 || Socorro || LINEAR || — || align=right | 2.1 km || 
|-id=318 bgcolor=#fefefe
| 84318 ||  || — || October 2, 2002 || Socorro || LINEAR || — || align=right | 1.4 km || 
|-id=319 bgcolor=#d6d6d6
| 84319 ||  || — || October 2, 2002 || Socorro || LINEAR || — || align=right | 4.7 km || 
|-id=320 bgcolor=#fefefe
| 84320 ||  || — || October 2, 2002 || Socorro || LINEAR || — || align=right | 1.9 km || 
|-id=321 bgcolor=#fefefe
| 84321 ||  || — || October 2, 2002 || Socorro || LINEAR || V || align=right | 1.3 km || 
|-id=322 bgcolor=#E9E9E9
| 84322 ||  || — || October 2, 2002 || Socorro || LINEAR || — || align=right | 4.5 km || 
|-id=323 bgcolor=#fefefe
| 84323 ||  || — || October 2, 2002 || Socorro || LINEAR || — || align=right | 2.3 km || 
|-id=324 bgcolor=#d6d6d6
| 84324 ||  || — || October 2, 2002 || Socorro || LINEAR || HYG || align=right | 7.1 km || 
|-id=325 bgcolor=#d6d6d6
| 84325 ||  || — || October 2, 2002 || Socorro || LINEAR || URS || align=right | 8.0 km || 
|-id=326 bgcolor=#d6d6d6
| 84326 ||  || — || October 2, 2002 || Socorro || LINEAR || EOS || align=right | 4.8 km || 
|-id=327 bgcolor=#E9E9E9
| 84327 ||  || — || October 2, 2002 || Socorro || LINEAR || — || align=right | 5.4 km || 
|-id=328 bgcolor=#fefefe
| 84328 ||  || — || October 2, 2002 || Socorro || LINEAR || V || align=right | 1.8 km || 
|-id=329 bgcolor=#E9E9E9
| 84329 ||  || — || October 2, 2002 || Socorro || LINEAR || — || align=right | 3.7 km || 
|-id=330 bgcolor=#fefefe
| 84330 ||  || — || October 2, 2002 || Socorro || LINEAR || FLO || align=right | 1.3 km || 
|-id=331 bgcolor=#E9E9E9
| 84331 ||  || — || October 2, 2002 || Socorro || LINEAR || — || align=right | 3.0 km || 
|-id=332 bgcolor=#E9E9E9
| 84332 ||  || — || October 2, 2002 || Socorro || LINEAR || — || align=right | 5.5 km || 
|-id=333 bgcolor=#E9E9E9
| 84333 ||  || — || October 2, 2002 || Socorro || LINEAR || — || align=right | 6.0 km || 
|-id=334 bgcolor=#d6d6d6
| 84334 ||  || — || October 2, 2002 || Socorro || LINEAR || — || align=right | 7.8 km || 
|-id=335 bgcolor=#E9E9E9
| 84335 ||  || — || October 2, 2002 || Socorro || LINEAR || — || align=right | 2.2 km || 
|-id=336 bgcolor=#E9E9E9
| 84336 ||  || — || October 2, 2002 || Socorro || LINEAR || — || align=right | 2.7 km || 
|-id=337 bgcolor=#fefefe
| 84337 ||  || — || October 2, 2002 || Socorro || LINEAR || FLO || align=right | 1.5 km || 
|-id=338 bgcolor=#fefefe
| 84338 ||  || — || October 2, 2002 || Socorro || LINEAR || — || align=right | 1.8 km || 
|-id=339 bgcolor=#E9E9E9
| 84339 Francescaballi ||  ||  || October 2, 2002 || Campo Imperatore || F. Bernardi || — || align=right | 3.4 km || 
|-id=340 bgcolor=#fefefe
| 84340 Jos ||  ||  || October 2, 2002 || Needville || J. Dellinger || — || align=right | 1.5 km || 
|-id=341 bgcolor=#E9E9E9
| 84341 ||  || — || October 4, 2002 || Palomar || NEAT || — || align=right | 2.5 km || 
|-id=342 bgcolor=#fefefe
| 84342 Rubensdeazevedo ||  ||  || October 5, 2002 || Fountain Hills || C. W. Juels, P. R. Holvorcem || — || align=right | 1.4 km || 
|-id=343 bgcolor=#fefefe
| 84343 ||  || — || October 4, 2002 || Palomar || NEAT || V || align=right | 1.1 km || 
|-id=344 bgcolor=#d6d6d6
| 84344 ||  || — || October 5, 2002 || Socorro || LINEAR || — || align=right | 8.3 km || 
|-id=345 bgcolor=#E9E9E9
| 84345 ||  || — || October 3, 2002 || Palomar || NEAT || GEF || align=right | 2.6 km || 
|-id=346 bgcolor=#E9E9E9
| 84346 ||  || — || October 3, 2002 || Palomar || NEAT || ADE || align=right | 4.5 km || 
|-id=347 bgcolor=#fefefe
| 84347 ||  || — || October 3, 2002 || Palomar || NEAT || V || align=right | 1.7 km || 
|-id=348 bgcolor=#E9E9E9
| 84348 ||  || — || October 3, 2002 || Palomar || NEAT || — || align=right | 2.2 km || 
|-id=349 bgcolor=#fefefe
| 84349 ||  || — || October 1, 2002 || Anderson Mesa || LONEOS || — || align=right | 2.0 km || 
|-id=350 bgcolor=#E9E9E9
| 84350 ||  || — || October 1, 2002 || Anderson Mesa || LONEOS || — || align=right | 5.9 km || 
|-id=351 bgcolor=#fefefe
| 84351 ||  || — || October 1, 2002 || Anderson Mesa || LONEOS || — || align=right | 1.5 km || 
|-id=352 bgcolor=#E9E9E9
| 84352 ||  || — || October 1, 2002 || Socorro || LINEAR || — || align=right | 2.3 km || 
|-id=353 bgcolor=#fefefe
| 84353 ||  || — || October 1, 2002 || Socorro || LINEAR || FLO || align=right | 1.7 km || 
|-id=354 bgcolor=#E9E9E9
| 84354 ||  || — || October 1, 2002 || Socorro || LINEAR || EUN || align=right | 3.2 km || 
|-id=355 bgcolor=#fefefe
| 84355 ||  || — || October 1, 2002 || Socorro || LINEAR || V || align=right | 1.5 km || 
|-id=356 bgcolor=#E9E9E9
| 84356 ||  || — || October 1, 2002 || Črni Vrh || Črni Vrh || — || align=right | 2.8 km || 
|-id=357 bgcolor=#fefefe
| 84357 ||  || — || October 1, 2002 || Črni Vrh || Črni Vrh || V || align=right | 1.6 km || 
|-id=358 bgcolor=#fefefe
| 84358 ||  || — || October 2, 2002 || Haleakala || NEAT || — || align=right | 3.8 km || 
|-id=359 bgcolor=#fefefe
| 84359 ||  || — || October 2, 2002 || Haleakala || NEAT || — || align=right | 2.0 km || 
|-id=360 bgcolor=#E9E9E9
| 84360 ||  || — || October 2, 2002 || Haleakala || NEAT || — || align=right | 4.3 km || 
|-id=361 bgcolor=#fefefe
| 84361 ||  || — || October 2, 2002 || Haleakala || NEAT || V || align=right | 1.4 km || 
|-id=362 bgcolor=#E9E9E9
| 84362 ||  || — || October 3, 2002 || Palomar || NEAT || — || align=right | 4.3 km || 
|-id=363 bgcolor=#E9E9E9
| 84363 ||  || — || October 3, 2002 || Palomar || NEAT || — || align=right | 5.5 km || 
|-id=364 bgcolor=#E9E9E9
| 84364 ||  || — || October 2, 2002 || Haleakala || NEAT || JUN || align=right | 2.4 km || 
|-id=365 bgcolor=#d6d6d6
| 84365 ||  || — || October 3, 2002 || Socorro || LINEAR || 7:4 || align=right | 9.1 km || 
|-id=366 bgcolor=#fefefe
| 84366 ||  || — || October 3, 2002 || Socorro || LINEAR || V || align=right | 1.4 km || 
|-id=367 bgcolor=#d6d6d6
| 84367 ||  || — || October 3, 2002 || Palomar || NEAT || — || align=right | 6.0 km || 
|-id=368 bgcolor=#E9E9E9
| 84368 ||  || — || October 3, 2002 || Palomar || NEAT || MAR || align=right | 1.9 km || 
|-id=369 bgcolor=#d6d6d6
| 84369 ||  || — || October 3, 2002 || Palomar || NEAT || — || align=right | 4.3 km || 
|-id=370 bgcolor=#d6d6d6
| 84370 ||  || — || October 3, 2002 || Palomar || NEAT || — || align=right | 9.2 km || 
|-id=371 bgcolor=#fefefe
| 84371 ||  || — || October 4, 2002 || Palomar || NEAT || — || align=right | 2.2 km || 
|-id=372 bgcolor=#fefefe
| 84372 ||  || — || October 4, 2002 || Palomar || NEAT || — || align=right | 1.6 km || 
|-id=373 bgcolor=#fefefe
| 84373 ||  || — || October 4, 2002 || Palomar || NEAT || — || align=right | 2.3 km || 
|-id=374 bgcolor=#E9E9E9
| 84374 ||  || — || October 4, 2002 || Socorro || LINEAR || EUN || align=right | 2.3 km || 
|-id=375 bgcolor=#d6d6d6
| 84375 ||  || — || October 4, 2002 || Socorro || LINEAR || EOS || align=right | 5.2 km || 
|-id=376 bgcolor=#E9E9E9
| 84376 ||  || — || October 4, 2002 || Socorro || LINEAR || — || align=right | 2.4 km || 
|-id=377 bgcolor=#E9E9E9
| 84377 ||  || — || October 4, 2002 || Anderson Mesa || LONEOS || — || align=right | 5.5 km || 
|-id=378 bgcolor=#fefefe
| 84378 ||  || — || October 4, 2002 || Anderson Mesa || LONEOS || V || align=right | 1.3 km || 
|-id=379 bgcolor=#E9E9E9
| 84379 ||  || — || October 4, 2002 || Anderson Mesa || LONEOS || — || align=right | 2.2 km || 
|-id=380 bgcolor=#E9E9E9
| 84380 ||  || — || October 4, 2002 || Anderson Mesa || LONEOS || — || align=right | 2.2 km || 
|-id=381 bgcolor=#d6d6d6
| 84381 ||  || — || October 4, 2002 || Anderson Mesa || LONEOS || — || align=right | 8.3 km || 
|-id=382 bgcolor=#E9E9E9
| 84382 ||  || — || October 4, 2002 || Anderson Mesa || LONEOS || DOR || align=right | 6.6 km || 
|-id=383 bgcolor=#fefefe
| 84383 ||  || — || October 4, 2002 || Socorro || LINEAR || V || align=right | 1.3 km || 
|-id=384 bgcolor=#E9E9E9
| 84384 ||  || — || October 4, 2002 || Socorro || LINEAR || DOR || align=right | 6.1 km || 
|-id=385 bgcolor=#E9E9E9
| 84385 ||  || — || October 4, 2002 || Socorro || LINEAR || — || align=right | 6.2 km || 
|-id=386 bgcolor=#fefefe
| 84386 ||  || — || October 4, 2002 || Socorro || LINEAR || FLO || align=right | 1.2 km || 
|-id=387 bgcolor=#d6d6d6
| 84387 ||  || — || October 5, 2002 || Socorro || LINEAR || — || align=right | 3.9 km || 
|-id=388 bgcolor=#d6d6d6
| 84388 ||  || — || October 5, 2002 || Palomar || NEAT || — || align=right | 4.7 km || 
|-id=389 bgcolor=#E9E9E9
| 84389 ||  || — || October 5, 2002 || Palomar || NEAT || MAR || align=right | 2.9 km || 
|-id=390 bgcolor=#E9E9E9
| 84390 ||  || — || October 5, 2002 || Palomar || NEAT || ADE || align=right | 4.0 km || 
|-id=391 bgcolor=#E9E9E9
| 84391 ||  || — || October 5, 2002 || Palomar || NEAT || EUN || align=right | 3.0 km || 
|-id=392 bgcolor=#fefefe
| 84392 ||  || — || October 5, 2002 || Palomar || NEAT || — || align=right | 1.9 km || 
|-id=393 bgcolor=#E9E9E9
| 84393 ||  || — || October 5, 2002 || Palomar || NEAT || ADE || align=right | 2.9 km || 
|-id=394 bgcolor=#fefefe
| 84394 ||  || — || October 4, 2002 || Socorro || LINEAR || — || align=right | 1.7 km || 
|-id=395 bgcolor=#fefefe
| 84395 ||  || — || October 5, 2002 || Socorro || LINEAR || V || align=right | 1.3 km || 
|-id=396 bgcolor=#E9E9E9
| 84396 ||  || — || October 5, 2002 || Socorro || LINEAR || — || align=right | 4.0 km || 
|-id=397 bgcolor=#d6d6d6
| 84397 ||  || — || October 12, 2002 || Socorro || LINEAR || — || align=right | 4.6 km || 
|-id=398 bgcolor=#d6d6d6
| 84398 ||  || — || October 13, 2002 || Palomar || NEAT || — || align=right | 7.9 km || 
|-id=399 bgcolor=#d6d6d6
| 84399 ||  || — || October 14, 2002 || Socorro || LINEAR || — || align=right | 5.4 km || 
|-id=400 bgcolor=#E9E9E9
| 84400 ||  || — || October 14, 2002 || Socorro || LINEAR || MAR || align=right | 3.3 km || 
|}

84401–84500 

|-bgcolor=#E9E9E9
| 84401 ||  || — || October 14, 2002 || Socorro || LINEAR || WAT || align=right | 5.0 km || 
|-id=402 bgcolor=#fefefe
| 84402 ||  || — || October 14, 2002 || Socorro || LINEAR || — || align=right | 4.5 km || 
|-id=403 bgcolor=#d6d6d6
| 84403 ||  || — || October 14, 2002 || Socorro || LINEAR || — || align=right | 6.5 km || 
|-id=404 bgcolor=#d6d6d6
| 84404 ||  || — || October 14, 2002 || Socorro || LINEAR || ALA || align=right | 12 km || 
|-id=405 bgcolor=#E9E9E9
| 84405 ||  || — || October 14, 2002 || Socorro || LINEAR || — || align=right | 5.8 km || 
|-id=406 bgcolor=#fefefe
| 84406 ||  || — || October 3, 2002 || Socorro || LINEAR || — || align=right | 1.1 km || 
|-id=407 bgcolor=#d6d6d6
| 84407 ||  || — || October 3, 2002 || Socorro || LINEAR || — || align=right | 4.8 km || 
|-id=408 bgcolor=#E9E9E9
| 84408 ||  || — || October 3, 2002 || Socorro || LINEAR || — || align=right | 5.0 km || 
|-id=409 bgcolor=#fefefe
| 84409 ||  || — || October 4, 2002 || Socorro || LINEAR || — || align=right | 1.6 km || 
|-id=410 bgcolor=#d6d6d6
| 84410 ||  || — || October 4, 2002 || Socorro || LINEAR || TIR || align=right | 3.9 km || 
|-id=411 bgcolor=#E9E9E9
| 84411 ||  || — || October 4, 2002 || Socorro || LINEAR || — || align=right | 1.8 km || 
|-id=412 bgcolor=#fefefe
| 84412 ||  || — || October 4, 2002 || Socorro || LINEAR || — || align=right | 2.6 km || 
|-id=413 bgcolor=#E9E9E9
| 84413 ||  || — || October 5, 2002 || Anderson Mesa || LONEOS || — || align=right | 4.3 km || 
|-id=414 bgcolor=#E9E9E9
| 84414 ||  || — || October 3, 2002 || Socorro || LINEAR || — || align=right | 4.9 km || 
|-id=415 bgcolor=#d6d6d6
| 84415 ||  || — || October 3, 2002 || Socorro || LINEAR || — || align=right | 4.7 km || 
|-id=416 bgcolor=#E9E9E9
| 84416 ||  || — || October 3, 2002 || Socorro || LINEAR || — || align=right | 3.2 km || 
|-id=417 bgcolor=#E9E9E9
| 84417 Ritabo ||  ||  || October 5, 2002 || Coddenham || T. Boles || — || align=right | 4.5 km || 
|-id=418 bgcolor=#d6d6d6
| 84418 ||  || — || October 4, 2002 || Socorro || LINEAR || — || align=right | 5.8 km || 
|-id=419 bgcolor=#fefefe
| 84419 ||  || — || October 4, 2002 || Socorro || LINEAR || — || align=right | 2.1 km || 
|-id=420 bgcolor=#d6d6d6
| 84420 ||  || — || October 4, 2002 || Socorro || LINEAR || HYG || align=right | 4.5 km || 
|-id=421 bgcolor=#fefefe
| 84421 ||  || — || October 4, 2002 || Socorro || LINEAR || — || align=right | 1.5 km || 
|-id=422 bgcolor=#E9E9E9
| 84422 ||  || — || October 6, 2002 || Haleakala || NEAT || — || align=right | 1.8 km || 
|-id=423 bgcolor=#E9E9E9
| 84423 ||  || — || October 6, 2002 || Haleakala || NEAT || CLO || align=right | 6.9 km || 
|-id=424 bgcolor=#d6d6d6
| 84424 ||  || — || October 7, 2002 || Socorro || LINEAR || HYG || align=right | 8.0 km || 
|-id=425 bgcolor=#E9E9E9
| 84425 ||  || — || October 5, 2002 || Socorro || LINEAR || MAR || align=right | 3.3 km || 
|-id=426 bgcolor=#fefefe
| 84426 ||  || — || October 5, 2002 || Socorro || LINEAR || — || align=right | 2.1 km || 
|-id=427 bgcolor=#E9E9E9
| 84427 ||  || — || October 7, 2002 || Socorro || LINEAR || — || align=right | 2.6 km || 
|-id=428 bgcolor=#fefefe
| 84428 ||  || — || October 7, 2002 || Anderson Mesa || LONEOS || — || align=right | 1.6 km || 
|-id=429 bgcolor=#fefefe
| 84429 ||  || — || October 7, 2002 || Socorro || LINEAR || — || align=right | 1.4 km || 
|-id=430 bgcolor=#fefefe
| 84430 ||  || — || October 8, 2002 || Anderson Mesa || LONEOS || — || align=right | 2.2 km || 
|-id=431 bgcolor=#d6d6d6
| 84431 ||  || — || October 8, 2002 || Anderson Mesa || LONEOS || — || align=right | 4.2 km || 
|-id=432 bgcolor=#d6d6d6
| 84432 ||  || — || October 8, 2002 || Anderson Mesa || LONEOS || TEL || align=right | 2.7 km || 
|-id=433 bgcolor=#E9E9E9
| 84433 ||  || — || October 8, 2002 || Anderson Mesa || LONEOS || — || align=right | 2.6 km || 
|-id=434 bgcolor=#E9E9E9
| 84434 ||  || — || October 8, 2002 || Anderson Mesa || LONEOS || — || align=right | 1.7 km || 
|-id=435 bgcolor=#E9E9E9
| 84435 ||  || — || October 8, 2002 || Anderson Mesa || LONEOS || — || align=right | 3.3 km || 
|-id=436 bgcolor=#E9E9E9
| 84436 ||  || — || October 7, 2002 || Haleakala || NEAT || EUN || align=right | 2.8 km || 
|-id=437 bgcolor=#E9E9E9
| 84437 ||  || — || October 8, 2002 || Palomar || NEAT || MAR || align=right | 2.4 km || 
|-id=438 bgcolor=#E9E9E9
| 84438 ||  || — || October 6, 2002 || Socorro || LINEAR || — || align=right | 2.9 km || 
|-id=439 bgcolor=#d6d6d6
| 84439 ||  || — || October 6, 2002 || Socorro || LINEAR || — || align=right | 5.1 km || 
|-id=440 bgcolor=#E9E9E9
| 84440 ||  || — || October 6, 2002 || Socorro || LINEAR || EUN || align=right | 3.3 km || 
|-id=441 bgcolor=#fefefe
| 84441 ||  || — || October 6, 2002 || Socorro || LINEAR || — || align=right | 4.7 km || 
|-id=442 bgcolor=#E9E9E9
| 84442 ||  || — || October 6, 2002 || Socorro || LINEAR || ADE || align=right | 7.1 km || 
|-id=443 bgcolor=#E9E9E9
| 84443 ||  || — || October 6, 2002 || Socorro || LINEAR || — || align=right | 4.2 km || 
|-id=444 bgcolor=#E9E9E9
| 84444 ||  || — || October 7, 2002 || Anderson Mesa || LONEOS || — || align=right | 1.9 km || 
|-id=445 bgcolor=#d6d6d6
| 84445 ||  || — || October 9, 2002 || Socorro || LINEAR || — || align=right | 9.9 km || 
|-id=446 bgcolor=#E9E9E9
| 84446 ||  || — || October 9, 2002 || Socorro || LINEAR || — || align=right | 3.5 km || 
|-id=447 bgcolor=#E9E9E9
| 84447 Jeffkanipe ||  ||  || October 6, 2002 || Haleakala || NEAT || — || align=right | 2.6 km || 
|-id=448 bgcolor=#d6d6d6
| 84448 ||  || — || October 6, 2002 || Haleakala || NEAT || — || align=right | 4.1 km || 
|-id=449 bgcolor=#d6d6d6
| 84449 ||  || — || October 7, 2002 || Socorro || LINEAR || — || align=right | 5.1 km || 
|-id=450 bgcolor=#fefefe
| 84450 ||  || — || October 8, 2002 || Anderson Mesa || LONEOS || fast? || align=right | 1.6 km || 
|-id=451 bgcolor=#d6d6d6
| 84451 ||  || — || October 9, 2002 || Socorro || LINEAR || EOS || align=right | 3.3 km || 
|-id=452 bgcolor=#d6d6d6
| 84452 ||  || — || October 7, 2002 || Socorro || LINEAR || — || align=right | 6.1 km || 
|-id=453 bgcolor=#fefefe
| 84453 ||  || — || October 7, 2002 || Socorro || LINEAR || V || align=right | 1.3 km || 
|-id=454 bgcolor=#d6d6d6
| 84454 ||  || — || October 7, 2002 || Anderson Mesa || LONEOS || — || align=right | 5.9 km || 
|-id=455 bgcolor=#d6d6d6
| 84455 ||  || — || October 7, 2002 || Anderson Mesa || LONEOS || — || align=right | 5.3 km || 
|-id=456 bgcolor=#E9E9E9
| 84456 ||  || — || October 7, 2002 || Socorro || LINEAR || HEN || align=right | 2.2 km || 
|-id=457 bgcolor=#d6d6d6
| 84457 ||  || — || October 7, 2002 || Socorro || LINEAR || — || align=right | 4.7 km || 
|-id=458 bgcolor=#fefefe
| 84458 ||  || — || October 7, 2002 || Socorro || LINEAR || V || align=right | 1.3 km || 
|-id=459 bgcolor=#E9E9E9
| 84459 ||  || — || October 7, 2002 || Haleakala || NEAT || — || align=right | 5.1 km || 
|-id=460 bgcolor=#fefefe
| 84460 ||  || — || October 9, 2002 || Anderson Mesa || LONEOS || — || align=right | 1.6 km || 
|-id=461 bgcolor=#fefefe
| 84461 ||  || — || October 9, 2002 || Anderson Mesa || LONEOS || — || align=right | 1.8 km || 
|-id=462 bgcolor=#fefefe
| 84462 ||  || — || October 9, 2002 || Socorro || LINEAR || V || align=right | 1.8 km || 
|-id=463 bgcolor=#E9E9E9
| 84463 ||  || — || October 9, 2002 || Socorro || LINEAR || — || align=right | 2.2 km || 
|-id=464 bgcolor=#d6d6d6
| 84464 ||  || — || October 9, 2002 || Socorro || LINEAR || — || align=right | 5.9 km || 
|-id=465 bgcolor=#d6d6d6
| 84465 ||  || — || October 9, 2002 || Socorro || LINEAR || KAR || align=right | 2.7 km || 
|-id=466 bgcolor=#E9E9E9
| 84466 ||  || — || October 9, 2002 || Socorro || LINEAR || — || align=right | 2.9 km || 
|-id=467 bgcolor=#fefefe
| 84467 ||  || — || October 9, 2002 || Socorro || LINEAR || NYS || align=right | 1.7 km || 
|-id=468 bgcolor=#E9E9E9
| 84468 ||  || — || October 9, 2002 || Socorro || LINEAR || — || align=right | 3.4 km || 
|-id=469 bgcolor=#E9E9E9
| 84469 ||  || — || October 9, 2002 || Socorro || LINEAR || — || align=right | 3.3 km || 
|-id=470 bgcolor=#E9E9E9
| 84470 ||  || — || October 9, 2002 || Socorro || LINEAR || — || align=right | 2.0 km || 
|-id=471 bgcolor=#E9E9E9
| 84471 ||  || — || October 9, 2002 || Socorro || LINEAR || WIT || align=right | 2.3 km || 
|-id=472 bgcolor=#fefefe
| 84472 ||  || — || October 9, 2002 || Socorro || LINEAR || FLO || align=right | 1.7 km || 
|-id=473 bgcolor=#fefefe
| 84473 ||  || — || October 9, 2002 || Socorro || LINEAR || — || align=right | 2.4 km || 
|-id=474 bgcolor=#fefefe
| 84474 ||  || — || October 10, 2002 || Socorro || LINEAR || — || align=right | 1.9 km || 
|-id=475 bgcolor=#E9E9E9
| 84475 ||  || — || October 10, 2002 || Socorro || LINEAR || — || align=right | 2.5 km || 
|-id=476 bgcolor=#E9E9E9
| 84476 ||  || — || October 10, 2002 || Socorro || LINEAR || — || align=right | 4.8 km || 
|-id=477 bgcolor=#fefefe
| 84477 ||  || — || October 10, 2002 || Socorro || LINEAR || — || align=right | 2.1 km || 
|-id=478 bgcolor=#E9E9E9
| 84478 ||  || — || October 10, 2002 || Socorro || LINEAR || — || align=right | 3.2 km || 
|-id=479 bgcolor=#E9E9E9
| 84479 ||  || — || October 10, 2002 || Socorro || LINEAR || — || align=right | 3.3 km || 
|-id=480 bgcolor=#fefefe
| 84480 ||  || — || October 10, 2002 || Socorro || LINEAR || — || align=right | 4.9 km || 
|-id=481 bgcolor=#E9E9E9
| 84481 ||  || — || October 10, 2002 || Socorro || LINEAR || — || align=right | 3.7 km || 
|-id=482 bgcolor=#E9E9E9
| 84482 ||  || — || October 9, 2002 || Socorro || LINEAR || — || align=right | 2.5 km || 
|-id=483 bgcolor=#fefefe
| 84483 ||  || — || October 9, 2002 || Socorro || LINEAR || FLO || align=right | 1.4 km || 
|-id=484 bgcolor=#E9E9E9
| 84484 ||  || — || October 9, 2002 || Socorro || LINEAR || MAR || align=right | 2.6 km || 
|-id=485 bgcolor=#fefefe
| 84485 ||  || — || October 9, 2002 || Socorro || LINEAR || FLO || align=right | 1.2 km || 
|-id=486 bgcolor=#fefefe
| 84486 ||  || — || October 9, 2002 || Socorro || LINEAR || V || align=right | 1.4 km || 
|-id=487 bgcolor=#E9E9E9
| 84487 ||  || — || October 9, 2002 || Socorro || LINEAR || VIB || align=right | 4.2 km || 
|-id=488 bgcolor=#E9E9E9
| 84488 ||  || — || October 9, 2002 || Socorro || LINEAR || PAD || align=right | 4.5 km || 
|-id=489 bgcolor=#E9E9E9
| 84489 ||  || — || October 10, 2002 || Socorro || LINEAR || — || align=right | 2.0 km || 
|-id=490 bgcolor=#fefefe
| 84490 ||  || — || October 10, 2002 || Socorro || LINEAR || V || align=right | 1.4 km || 
|-id=491 bgcolor=#fefefe
| 84491 ||  || — || October 10, 2002 || Socorro || LINEAR || V || align=right | 1.4 km || 
|-id=492 bgcolor=#fefefe
| 84492 ||  || — || October 10, 2002 || Socorro || LINEAR || — || align=right | 2.3 km || 
|-id=493 bgcolor=#fefefe
| 84493 ||  || — || October 10, 2002 || Socorro || LINEAR || — || align=right | 1.8 km || 
|-id=494 bgcolor=#d6d6d6
| 84494 ||  || — || October 10, 2002 || Socorro || LINEAR || — || align=right | 5.9 km || 
|-id=495 bgcolor=#E9E9E9
| 84495 ||  || — || October 10, 2002 || Socorro || LINEAR || — || align=right | 3.1 km || 
|-id=496 bgcolor=#fefefe
| 84496 ||  || — || October 10, 2002 || Socorro || LINEAR || — || align=right | 2.1 km || 
|-id=497 bgcolor=#d6d6d6
| 84497 ||  || — || October 10, 2002 || Socorro || LINEAR || — || align=right | 6.5 km || 
|-id=498 bgcolor=#fefefe
| 84498 ||  || — || October 10, 2002 || Socorro || LINEAR || FLO || align=right | 3.4 km || 
|-id=499 bgcolor=#fefefe
| 84499 ||  || — || October 10, 2002 || Socorro || LINEAR || V || align=right | 1.3 km || 
|-id=500 bgcolor=#E9E9E9
| 84500 ||  || — || October 10, 2002 || Socorro || LINEAR || — || align=right | 2.0 km || 
|}

84501–84600 

|-bgcolor=#E9E9E9
| 84501 ||  || — || October 10, 2002 || Socorro || LINEAR || — || align=right | 3.5 km || 
|-id=502 bgcolor=#E9E9E9
| 84502 ||  || — || October 10, 2002 || Socorro || LINEAR || — || align=right | 4.9 km || 
|-id=503 bgcolor=#fefefe
| 84503 ||  || — || October 10, 2002 || Socorro || LINEAR || — || align=right | 3.1 km || 
|-id=504 bgcolor=#fefefe
| 84504 ||  || — || October 10, 2002 || Socorro || LINEAR || NYS || align=right | 1.3 km || 
|-id=505 bgcolor=#E9E9E9
| 84505 ||  || — || October 10, 2002 || Socorro || LINEAR || — || align=right | 2.9 km || 
|-id=506 bgcolor=#fefefe
| 84506 ||  || — || October 10, 2002 || Socorro || LINEAR || — || align=right | 2.2 km || 
|-id=507 bgcolor=#E9E9E9
| 84507 ||  || — || October 10, 2002 || Socorro || LINEAR || EUN || align=right | 2.8 km || 
|-id=508 bgcolor=#E9E9E9
| 84508 ||  || — || October 10, 2002 || Socorro || LINEAR || — || align=right | 6.0 km || 
|-id=509 bgcolor=#E9E9E9
| 84509 ||  || — || October 10, 2002 || Socorro || LINEAR || — || align=right | 2.4 km || 
|-id=510 bgcolor=#E9E9E9
| 84510 ||  || — || October 10, 2002 || Socorro || LINEAR || AGN || align=right | 2.7 km || 
|-id=511 bgcolor=#E9E9E9
| 84511 ||  || — || October 10, 2002 || Socorro || LINEAR || EUN || align=right | 3.7 km || 
|-id=512 bgcolor=#E9E9E9
| 84512 ||  || — || October 10, 2002 || Socorro || LINEAR || MAR || align=right | 4.1 km || 
|-id=513 bgcolor=#E9E9E9
| 84513 ||  || — || October 10, 2002 || Socorro || LINEAR || — || align=right | 4.3 km || 
|-id=514 bgcolor=#E9E9E9
| 84514 ||  || — || October 10, 2002 || Socorro || LINEAR || — || align=right | 4.9 km || 
|-id=515 bgcolor=#E9E9E9
| 84515 ||  || — || October 10, 2002 || Socorro || LINEAR || — || align=right | 6.9 km || 
|-id=516 bgcolor=#d6d6d6
| 84516 ||  || — || October 10, 2002 || Socorro || LINEAR || — || align=right | 7.3 km || 
|-id=517 bgcolor=#E9E9E9
| 84517 ||  || — || October 11, 2002 || Socorro || LINEAR || RAF || align=right | 1.9 km || 
|-id=518 bgcolor=#E9E9E9
| 84518 ||  || — || October 13, 2002 || Palomar || NEAT || HNS || align=right | 3.9 km || 
|-id=519 bgcolor=#E9E9E9
| 84519 ||  || — || October 13, 2002 || Palomar || NEAT || — || align=right | 4.0 km || 
|-id=520 bgcolor=#fefefe
| 84520 ||  || — || October 11, 2002 || Socorro || LINEAR || FLO || align=right | 1.1 km || 
|-id=521 bgcolor=#fefefe
| 84521 ||  || — || October 15, 2002 || Socorro || LINEAR || V || align=right | 1.7 km || 
|-id=522 bgcolor=#C2E0FF
| 84522 ||  || — || October 9, 2002 || Palomar || Palomar Obs. || res2:5 || align=right | 722 km || 
|-id=523 bgcolor=#d6d6d6
| 84523 ||  || — || October 28, 2002 || Palomar || NEAT || — || align=right | 5.9 km || 
|-id=524 bgcolor=#fefefe
| 84524 ||  || — || October 28, 2002 || Palomar || NEAT || FLO || align=right | 1.3 km || 
|-id=525 bgcolor=#d6d6d6
| 84525 ||  || — || October 28, 2002 || Palomar || NEAT || EOS || align=right | 3.8 km || 
|-id=526 bgcolor=#E9E9E9
| 84526 ||  || — || October 28, 2002 || Palomar || NEAT || EUN || align=right | 2.6 km || 
|-id=527 bgcolor=#E9E9E9
| 84527 ||  || — || October 28, 2002 || Palomar || NEAT || EUN || align=right | 3.1 km || 
|-id=528 bgcolor=#d6d6d6
| 84528 ||  || — || October 28, 2002 || Kitt Peak || Spacewatch || — || align=right | 4.7 km || 
|-id=529 bgcolor=#fefefe
| 84529 ||  || — || October 28, 2002 || Haleakala || NEAT || — || align=right | 1.6 km || 
|-id=530 bgcolor=#E9E9E9
| 84530 ||  || — || October 29, 2002 || Kvistaberg || UDAS || — || align=right | 3.1 km || 
|-id=531 bgcolor=#d6d6d6
| 84531 ||  || — || October 28, 2002 || Palomar || NEAT || — || align=right | 7.6 km || 
|-id=532 bgcolor=#E9E9E9
| 84532 ||  || — || October 30, 2002 || Socorro || LINEAR || — || align=right | 3.4 km || 
|-id=533 bgcolor=#d6d6d6
| 84533 ||  || — || October 30, 2002 || Palomar || NEAT || — || align=right | 6.3 km || 
|-id=534 bgcolor=#E9E9E9
| 84534 ||  || — || October 30, 2002 || Haleakala || NEAT || — || align=right | 5.3 km || 
|-id=535 bgcolor=#E9E9E9
| 84535 ||  || — || October 30, 2002 || Haleakala || NEAT || — || align=right | 6.0 km || 
|-id=536 bgcolor=#fefefe
| 84536 ||  || — || October 30, 2002 || Haleakala || NEAT || SUL || align=right | 4.3 km || 
|-id=537 bgcolor=#fefefe
| 84537 ||  || — || October 28, 2002 || Kitt Peak || Spacewatch || NYS || align=right | 1.2 km || 
|-id=538 bgcolor=#E9E9E9
| 84538 ||  || — || October 30, 2002 || Palomar || NEAT || — || align=right | 2.7 km || 
|-id=539 bgcolor=#fefefe
| 84539 ||  || — || October 30, 2002 || Haleakala || NEAT || — || align=right | 1.9 km || 
|-id=540 bgcolor=#E9E9E9
| 84540 ||  || — || October 30, 2002 || Palomar || NEAT || NEM || align=right | 4.7 km || 
|-id=541 bgcolor=#fefefe
| 84541 ||  || — || October 31, 2002 || Socorro || LINEAR || V || align=right | 1.3 km || 
|-id=542 bgcolor=#E9E9E9
| 84542 ||  || — || October 31, 2002 || Anderson Mesa || LONEOS || — || align=right | 1.9 km || 
|-id=543 bgcolor=#d6d6d6
| 84543 ||  || — || October 30, 2002 || Palomar || NEAT || — || align=right | 5.9 km || 
|-id=544 bgcolor=#E9E9E9
| 84544 ||  || — || October 31, 2002 || Socorro || LINEAR || — || align=right | 4.6 km || 
|-id=545 bgcolor=#fefefe
| 84545 ||  || — || October 31, 2002 || Palomar || NEAT || — || align=right | 2.0 km || 
|-id=546 bgcolor=#fefefe
| 84546 ||  || — || October 31, 2002 || Palomar || NEAT || — || align=right | 2.1 km || 
|-id=547 bgcolor=#E9E9E9
| 84547 ||  || — || October 30, 2002 || Haleakala || NEAT || GEF || align=right | 2.7 km || 
|-id=548 bgcolor=#fefefe
| 84548 ||  || — || October 30, 2002 || Haleakala || NEAT || V || align=right | 1.5 km || 
|-id=549 bgcolor=#E9E9E9
| 84549 ||  || — || October 31, 2002 || Anderson Mesa || LONEOS || GEF || align=right | 2.7 km || 
|-id=550 bgcolor=#d6d6d6
| 84550 ||  || — || October 31, 2002 || Anderson Mesa || LONEOS || — || align=right | 6.5 km || 
|-id=551 bgcolor=#d6d6d6
| 84551 ||  || — || October 31, 2002 || Anderson Mesa || LONEOS || KOR || align=right | 3.4 km || 
|-id=552 bgcolor=#d6d6d6
| 84552 ||  || — || October 31, 2002 || Anderson Mesa || LONEOS || KOR || align=right | 3.0 km || 
|-id=553 bgcolor=#E9E9E9
| 84553 ||  || — || October 31, 2002 || Palomar || NEAT || — || align=right | 2.9 km || 
|-id=554 bgcolor=#d6d6d6
| 84554 ||  || — || October 31, 2002 || Anderson Mesa || LONEOS || KOR || align=right | 2.8 km || 
|-id=555 bgcolor=#E9E9E9
| 84555 ||  || — || October 31, 2002 || Socorro || LINEAR || — || align=right | 3.0 km || 
|-id=556 bgcolor=#fefefe
| 84556 ||  || — || October 31, 2002 || Anderson Mesa || LONEOS || — || align=right | 1.8 km || 
|-id=557 bgcolor=#E9E9E9
| 84557 || 2002 VC || — || November 1, 2002 || Ametlla de Mar || Ametlla de Mar Obs. || EUN || align=right | 3.2 km || 
|-id=558 bgcolor=#d6d6d6
| 84558 ||  || — || November 1, 2002 || Palomar || NEAT || KOR || align=right | 2.7 km || 
|-id=559 bgcolor=#E9E9E9
| 84559 ||  || — || November 1, 2002 || Palomar || NEAT || — || align=right | 2.4 km || 
|-id=560 bgcolor=#E9E9E9
| 84560 ||  || — || November 1, 2002 || Palomar || NEAT || — || align=right | 3.5 km || 
|-id=561 bgcolor=#d6d6d6
| 84561 ||  || — || November 4, 2002 || Palomar || NEAT || — || align=right | 4.3 km || 
|-id=562 bgcolor=#d6d6d6
| 84562 ||  || — || November 4, 2002 || Haleakala || NEAT || — || align=right | 5.2 km || 
|-id=563 bgcolor=#d6d6d6
| 84563 ||  || — || November 1, 2002 || Palomar || NEAT || — || align=right | 4.3 km || 
|-id=564 bgcolor=#fefefe
| 84564 ||  || — || November 1, 2002 || Palomar || NEAT || V || align=right | 1.4 km || 
|-id=565 bgcolor=#fefefe
| 84565 ||  || — || November 1, 2002 || Socorro || LINEAR || V || align=right | 1.7 km || 
|-id=566 bgcolor=#E9E9E9
| 84566 VIMS ||  ||  || November 1, 2002 || Palomar || NEAT || — || align=right | 4.5 km || 
|-id=567 bgcolor=#E9E9E9
| 84567 ||  || — || November 1, 2002 || Palomar || NEAT || — || align=right | 4.5 km || 
|-id=568 bgcolor=#d6d6d6
| 84568 ||  || — || November 1, 2002 || Palomar || NEAT || KOR || align=right | 2.5 km || 
|-id=569 bgcolor=#fefefe
| 84569 ||  || — || November 1, 2002 || Palomar || NEAT || FLO || align=right | 2.3 km || 
|-id=570 bgcolor=#fefefe
| 84570 ||  || — || November 1, 2002 || Palomar || NEAT || — || align=right | 2.3 km || 
|-id=571 bgcolor=#E9E9E9
| 84571 ||  || — || November 4, 2002 || Kitt Peak || Spacewatch || — || align=right | 2.3 km || 
|-id=572 bgcolor=#fefefe
| 84572 ||  || — || November 5, 2002 || Anderson Mesa || LONEOS || — || align=right | 1.4 km || 
|-id=573 bgcolor=#E9E9E9
| 84573 ||  || — || November 6, 2002 || Socorro || LINEAR || — || align=right | 4.2 km || 
|-id=574 bgcolor=#d6d6d6
| 84574 ||  || — || November 5, 2002 || Socorro || LINEAR || — || align=right | 6.1 km || 
|-id=575 bgcolor=#d6d6d6
| 84575 ||  || — || November 4, 2002 || Kitt Peak || Spacewatch || 7:4 || align=right | 7.2 km || 
|-id=576 bgcolor=#d6d6d6
| 84576 ||  || — || November 4, 2002 || Kitt Peak || Spacewatch || — || align=right | 4.7 km || 
|-id=577 bgcolor=#fefefe
| 84577 ||  || — || November 5, 2002 || Socorro || LINEAR || FLO || align=right | 1.4 km || 
|-id=578 bgcolor=#E9E9E9
| 84578 ||  || — || November 5, 2002 || Socorro || LINEAR || — || align=right | 3.7 km || 
|-id=579 bgcolor=#E9E9E9
| 84579 ||  || — || November 4, 2002 || Anderson Mesa || LONEOS || — || align=right | 2.9 km || 
|-id=580 bgcolor=#E9E9E9
| 84580 ||  || — || November 4, 2002 || Kitt Peak || Spacewatch || EUN || align=right | 2.6 km || 
|-id=581 bgcolor=#fefefe
| 84581 ||  || — || November 4, 2002 || Kitt Peak || Spacewatch || — || align=right | 2.4 km || 
|-id=582 bgcolor=#d6d6d6
| 84582 ||  || — || November 5, 2002 || Socorro || LINEAR || — || align=right | 7.6 km || 
|-id=583 bgcolor=#E9E9E9
| 84583 ||  || — || November 5, 2002 || Socorro || LINEAR || — || align=right | 3.7 km || 
|-id=584 bgcolor=#fefefe
| 84584 ||  || — || November 5, 2002 || Anderson Mesa || LONEOS || — || align=right | 1.9 km || 
|-id=585 bgcolor=#E9E9E9
| 84585 ||  || — || November 5, 2002 || Anderson Mesa || LONEOS || — || align=right | 6.2 km || 
|-id=586 bgcolor=#E9E9E9
| 84586 ||  || — || November 5, 2002 || Anderson Mesa || LONEOS || — || align=right | 3.6 km || 
|-id=587 bgcolor=#E9E9E9
| 84587 ||  || — || November 5, 2002 || Anderson Mesa || LONEOS || — || align=right | 3.9 km || 
|-id=588 bgcolor=#fefefe
| 84588 ||  || — || November 5, 2002 || Anderson Mesa || LONEOS || V || align=right | 1.3 km || 
|-id=589 bgcolor=#E9E9E9
| 84589 ||  || — || November 5, 2002 || Anderson Mesa || LONEOS || — || align=right | 2.5 km || 
|-id=590 bgcolor=#E9E9E9
| 84590 ||  || — || November 5, 2002 || Anderson Mesa || LONEOS || EUN || align=right | 2.2 km || 
|-id=591 bgcolor=#fefefe
| 84591 ||  || — || November 5, 2002 || Socorro || LINEAR || — || align=right | 2.7 km || 
|-id=592 bgcolor=#d6d6d6
| 84592 ||  || — || November 5, 2002 || Socorro || LINEAR || NAE || align=right | 7.1 km || 
|-id=593 bgcolor=#E9E9E9
| 84593 ||  || — || November 5, 2002 || Socorro || LINEAR || — || align=right | 3.4 km || 
|-id=594 bgcolor=#fefefe
| 84594 ||  || — || November 5, 2002 || Socorro || LINEAR || NYS || align=right | 1.4 km || 
|-id=595 bgcolor=#d6d6d6
| 84595 ||  || — || November 5, 2002 || Socorro || LINEAR || — || align=right | 5.2 km || 
|-id=596 bgcolor=#fefefe
| 84596 ||  || — || November 5, 2002 || Socorro || LINEAR || V || align=right | 1.4 km || 
|-id=597 bgcolor=#fefefe
| 84597 ||  || — || November 5, 2002 || Socorro || LINEAR || V || align=right | 1.4 km || 
|-id=598 bgcolor=#d6d6d6
| 84598 ||  || — || November 5, 2002 || Socorro || LINEAR || — || align=right | 4.5 km || 
|-id=599 bgcolor=#d6d6d6
| 84599 ||  || — || November 5, 2002 || Socorro || LINEAR || — || align=right | 4.6 km || 
|-id=600 bgcolor=#d6d6d6
| 84600 ||  || — || November 5, 2002 || Socorro || LINEAR || — || align=right | 4.9 km || 
|}

84601–84700 

|-bgcolor=#E9E9E9
| 84601 ||  || — || November 5, 2002 || Socorro || LINEAR || — || align=right | 4.2 km || 
|-id=602 bgcolor=#E9E9E9
| 84602 ||  || — || November 5, 2002 || Socorro || LINEAR || — || align=right | 4.0 km || 
|-id=603 bgcolor=#E9E9E9
| 84603 ||  || — || November 5, 2002 || Socorro || LINEAR || — || align=right | 2.8 km || 
|-id=604 bgcolor=#d6d6d6
| 84604 ||  || — || November 5, 2002 || Socorro || LINEAR || — || align=right | 8.1 km || 
|-id=605 bgcolor=#E9E9E9
| 84605 ||  || — || November 5, 2002 || Socorro || LINEAR || MRX || align=right | 2.5 km || 
|-id=606 bgcolor=#d6d6d6
| 84606 ||  || — || November 5, 2002 || Kitt Peak || Spacewatch || HYG || align=right | 6.9 km || 
|-id=607 bgcolor=#d6d6d6
| 84607 ||  || — || November 5, 2002 || Socorro || LINEAR || KOR || align=right | 3.3 km || 
|-id=608 bgcolor=#fefefe
| 84608 ||  || — || November 5, 2002 || Kitt Peak || Spacewatch || — || align=right | 1.3 km || 
|-id=609 bgcolor=#E9E9E9
| 84609 ||  || — || November 5, 2002 || Socorro || LINEAR || — || align=right | 3.8 km || 
|-id=610 bgcolor=#d6d6d6
| 84610 ||  || — || November 2, 2002 || Haleakala || NEAT || — || align=right | 5.0 km || 
|-id=611 bgcolor=#E9E9E9
| 84611 ||  || — || November 2, 2002 || Haleakala || NEAT || NEM || align=right | 3.4 km || 
|-id=612 bgcolor=#E9E9E9
| 84612 ||  || — || November 2, 2002 || Haleakala || NEAT || NEM || align=right | 5.8 km || 
|-id=613 bgcolor=#fefefe
| 84613 ||  || — || November 5, 2002 || Socorro || LINEAR || — || align=right | 1.8 km || 
|-id=614 bgcolor=#fefefe
| 84614 ||  || — || November 5, 2002 || Socorro || LINEAR || — || align=right | 4.3 km || 
|-id=615 bgcolor=#E9E9E9
| 84615 ||  || — || November 5, 2002 || Socorro || LINEAR || — || align=right | 5.3 km || 
|-id=616 bgcolor=#fefefe
| 84616 ||  || — || November 5, 2002 || Socorro || LINEAR || — || align=right | 1.7 km || 
|-id=617 bgcolor=#E9E9E9
| 84617 ||  || — || November 5, 2002 || Socorro || LINEAR || — || align=right | 5.7 km || 
|-id=618 bgcolor=#d6d6d6
| 84618 ||  || — || November 8, 2002 || Kingsnake || J. V. McClusky || — || align=right | 7.3 km || 
|-id=619 bgcolor=#fefefe
| 84619 ||  || — || November 4, 2002 || Palomar || NEAT || FLO || align=right | 1.4 km || 
|-id=620 bgcolor=#fefefe
| 84620 ||  || — || November 4, 2002 || Palomar || NEAT || — || align=right | 2.7 km || 
|-id=621 bgcolor=#E9E9E9
| 84621 ||  || — || November 4, 2002 || Haleakala || NEAT || ADE || align=right | 3.9 km || 
|-id=622 bgcolor=#fefefe
| 84622 ||  || — || November 4, 2002 || Haleakala || NEAT || — || align=right | 2.1 km || 
|-id=623 bgcolor=#E9E9E9
| 84623 ||  || — || November 4, 2002 || Haleakala || NEAT || — || align=right | 2.9 km || 
|-id=624 bgcolor=#d6d6d6
| 84624 ||  || — || November 5, 2002 || Fountain Hills || Fountain Hills Obs. || EOS || align=right | 4.8 km || 
|-id=625 bgcolor=#fefefe
| 84625 ||  || — || November 5, 2002 || Palomar || NEAT || — || align=right | 1.7 km || 
|-id=626 bgcolor=#E9E9E9
| 84626 ||  || — || November 5, 2002 || Palomar || NEAT || — || align=right | 3.1 km || 
|-id=627 bgcolor=#fefefe
| 84627 ||  || — || November 5, 2002 || Anderson Mesa || LONEOS || V || align=right | 1.5 km || 
|-id=628 bgcolor=#E9E9E9
| 84628 ||  || — || November 5, 2002 || Anderson Mesa || LONEOS || — || align=right | 3.0 km || 
|-id=629 bgcolor=#d6d6d6
| 84629 ||  || — || November 5, 2002 || Anderson Mesa || LONEOS || — || align=right | 5.2 km || 
|-id=630 bgcolor=#E9E9E9
| 84630 ||  || — || November 5, 2002 || Anderson Mesa || LONEOS || ADE || align=right | 5.6 km || 
|-id=631 bgcolor=#fefefe
| 84631 ||  || — || November 6, 2002 || Anderson Mesa || LONEOS || slow || align=right | 2.6 km || 
|-id=632 bgcolor=#E9E9E9
| 84632 ||  || — || November 6, 2002 || Anderson Mesa || LONEOS || ADE || align=right | 6.7 km || 
|-id=633 bgcolor=#fefefe
| 84633 ||  || — || November 6, 2002 || Socorro || LINEAR || — || align=right | 1.6 km || 
|-id=634 bgcolor=#E9E9E9
| 84634 ||  || — || November 6, 2002 || Socorro || LINEAR || HEN || align=right | 2.2 km || 
|-id=635 bgcolor=#E9E9E9
| 84635 ||  || — || November 6, 2002 || Socorro || LINEAR || — || align=right | 2.0 km || 
|-id=636 bgcolor=#d6d6d6
| 84636 ||  || — || November 6, 2002 || Anderson Mesa || LONEOS || — || align=right | 7.7 km || 
|-id=637 bgcolor=#E9E9E9
| 84637 ||  || — || November 6, 2002 || Anderson Mesa || LONEOS || — || align=right | 3.0 km || 
|-id=638 bgcolor=#fefefe
| 84638 ||  || — || November 6, 2002 || Socorro || LINEAR || FLO || align=right | 1.7 km || 
|-id=639 bgcolor=#fefefe
| 84639 ||  || — || November 6, 2002 || Socorro || LINEAR || — || align=right | 1.5 km || 
|-id=640 bgcolor=#d6d6d6
| 84640 ||  || — || November 6, 2002 || Anderson Mesa || LONEOS || EOS || align=right | 6.0 km || 
|-id=641 bgcolor=#E9E9E9
| 84641 ||  || — || November 6, 2002 || Haleakala || NEAT || GEF || align=right | 2.8 km || 
|-id=642 bgcolor=#fefefe
| 84642 ||  || — || November 6, 2002 || Haleakala || NEAT || — || align=right | 1.8 km || 
|-id=643 bgcolor=#E9E9E9
| 84643 ||  || — || November 6, 2002 || Haleakala || NEAT || MAR || align=right | 2.9 km || 
|-id=644 bgcolor=#E9E9E9
| 84644 ||  || — || November 6, 2002 || Haleakala || NEAT || — || align=right | 4.3 km || 
|-id=645 bgcolor=#fefefe
| 84645 ||  || — || November 1, 2002 || Socorro || LINEAR || — || align=right | 1.6 km || 
|-id=646 bgcolor=#E9E9E9
| 84646 ||  || — || November 3, 2002 || Haleakala || NEAT || HNS || align=right | 3.4 km || 
|-id=647 bgcolor=#E9E9E9
| 84647 ||  || — || November 3, 2002 || Haleakala || NEAT || — || align=right | 5.8 km || 
|-id=648 bgcolor=#d6d6d6
| 84648 ||  || — || November 3, 2002 || Haleakala || NEAT || URS || align=right | 8.8 km || 
|-id=649 bgcolor=#E9E9E9
| 84649 ||  || — || November 5, 2002 || Palomar || NEAT || — || align=right | 4.4 km || 
|-id=650 bgcolor=#d6d6d6
| 84650 ||  || — || November 7, 2002 || Kingsnake || J. V. McClusky || THM || align=right | 4.3 km || 
|-id=651 bgcolor=#d6d6d6
| 84651 ||  || — || November 6, 2002 || Socorro || LINEAR || — || align=right | 3.7 km || 
|-id=652 bgcolor=#d6d6d6
| 84652 ||  || — || November 7, 2002 || Socorro || LINEAR || — || align=right | 5.8 km || 
|-id=653 bgcolor=#E9E9E9
| 84653 ||  || — || November 7, 2002 || Anderson Mesa || LONEOS || EUN || align=right | 2.9 km || 
|-id=654 bgcolor=#fefefe
| 84654 ||  || — || November 7, 2002 || Socorro || LINEAR || FLO || align=right | 2.5 km || 
|-id=655 bgcolor=#E9E9E9
| 84655 ||  || — || November 7, 2002 || Socorro || LINEAR || — || align=right | 2.8 km || 
|-id=656 bgcolor=#fefefe
| 84656 ||  || — || November 7, 2002 || Socorro || LINEAR || — || align=right | 2.2 km || 
|-id=657 bgcolor=#fefefe
| 84657 ||  || — || November 7, 2002 || Socorro || LINEAR || NYS || align=right | 3.3 km || 
|-id=658 bgcolor=#d6d6d6
| 84658 ||  || — || November 7, 2002 || Socorro || LINEAR || KOR || align=right | 3.1 km || 
|-id=659 bgcolor=#fefefe
| 84659 ||  || — || November 7, 2002 || Socorro || LINEAR || V || align=right | 1.6 km || 
|-id=660 bgcolor=#E9E9E9
| 84660 ||  || — || November 7, 2002 || Socorro || LINEAR || — || align=right | 3.0 km || 
|-id=661 bgcolor=#d6d6d6
| 84661 ||  || — || November 7, 2002 || Socorro || LINEAR || — || align=right | 7.2 km || 
|-id=662 bgcolor=#d6d6d6
| 84662 ||  || — || November 7, 2002 || Socorro || LINEAR || EOS || align=right | 5.0 km || 
|-id=663 bgcolor=#d6d6d6
| 84663 ||  || — || November 7, 2002 || Socorro || LINEAR || — || align=right | 5.6 km || 
|-id=664 bgcolor=#E9E9E9
| 84664 ||  || — || November 7, 2002 || Socorro || LINEAR || EUN || align=right | 2.6 km || 
|-id=665 bgcolor=#E9E9E9
| 84665 ||  || — || November 7, 2002 || Socorro || LINEAR || GEF || align=right | 3.1 km || 
|-id=666 bgcolor=#E9E9E9
| 84666 ||  || — || November 7, 2002 || Socorro || LINEAR || — || align=right | 2.5 km || 
|-id=667 bgcolor=#FA8072
| 84667 ||  || — || November 7, 2002 || Socorro || LINEAR || — || align=right | 1.9 km || 
|-id=668 bgcolor=#fefefe
| 84668 ||  || — || November 7, 2002 || Socorro || LINEAR || V || align=right | 2.0 km || 
|-id=669 bgcolor=#E9E9E9
| 84669 ||  || — || November 7, 2002 || Socorro || LINEAR || GEF || align=right | 2.2 km || 
|-id=670 bgcolor=#E9E9E9
| 84670 ||  || — || November 7, 2002 || Socorro || LINEAR || — || align=right | 3.0 km || 
|-id=671 bgcolor=#E9E9E9
| 84671 ||  || — || November 7, 2002 || Socorro || LINEAR || — || align=right | 3.3 km || 
|-id=672 bgcolor=#E9E9E9
| 84672 ||  || — || November 7, 2002 || Socorro || LINEAR || — || align=right | 4.9 km || 
|-id=673 bgcolor=#E9E9E9
| 84673 ||  || — || November 8, 2002 || Socorro || LINEAR || PAD || align=right | 4.4 km || 
|-id=674 bgcolor=#E9E9E9
| 84674 ||  || — || November 8, 2002 || Socorro || LINEAR || — || align=right | 5.1 km || 
|-id=675 bgcolor=#d6d6d6
| 84675 ||  || — || November 8, 2002 || Socorro || LINEAR || — || align=right | 5.3 km || 
|-id=676 bgcolor=#E9E9E9
| 84676 ||  || — || November 11, 2002 || Socorro || LINEAR || — || align=right | 1.9 km || 
|-id=677 bgcolor=#E9E9E9
| 84677 ||  || — || November 11, 2002 || Anderson Mesa || LONEOS || — || align=right | 2.6 km || 
|-id=678 bgcolor=#E9E9E9
| 84678 ||  || — || November 11, 2002 || Anderson Mesa || LONEOS || MRX || align=right | 1.7 km || 
|-id=679 bgcolor=#E9E9E9
| 84679 ||  || — || November 11, 2002 || Anderson Mesa || LONEOS || — || align=right | 4.9 km || 
|-id=680 bgcolor=#d6d6d6
| 84680 ||  || — || November 11, 2002 || Socorro || LINEAR || — || align=right | 9.7 km || 
|-id=681 bgcolor=#fefefe
| 84681 ||  || — || November 11, 2002 || Palomar || NEAT || — || align=right | 4.4 km || 
|-id=682 bgcolor=#E9E9E9
| 84682 ||  || — || November 12, 2002 || Socorro || LINEAR || — || align=right | 3.7 km || 
|-id=683 bgcolor=#E9E9E9
| 84683 ||  || — || November 11, 2002 || Fountain Hills || Fountain Hills Obs. || — || align=right | 6.1 km || 
|-id=684 bgcolor=#E9E9E9
| 84684 ||  || — || November 11, 2002 || Anderson Mesa || LONEOS || — || align=right | 7.0 km || 
|-id=685 bgcolor=#d6d6d6
| 84685 ||  || — || November 11, 2002 || Socorro || LINEAR || — || align=right | 8.7 km || 
|-id=686 bgcolor=#E9E9E9
| 84686 ||  || — || November 12, 2002 || Kvistaberg || UDAS || HEN || align=right | 2.4 km || 
|-id=687 bgcolor=#E9E9E9
| 84687 ||  || — || November 12, 2002 || Socorro || LINEAR || DOR || align=right | 4.6 km || 
|-id=688 bgcolor=#E9E9E9
| 84688 ||  || — || November 12, 2002 || Socorro || LINEAR || — || align=right | 4.0 km || 
|-id=689 bgcolor=#fefefe
| 84689 ||  || — || November 12, 2002 || Socorro || LINEAR || V || align=right | 1.4 km || 
|-id=690 bgcolor=#fefefe
| 84690 ||  || — || November 12, 2002 || Socorro || LINEAR || — || align=right | 1.4 km || 
|-id=691 bgcolor=#E9E9E9
| 84691 ||  || — || November 12, 2002 || Socorro || LINEAR || — || align=right | 4.5 km || 
|-id=692 bgcolor=#E9E9E9
| 84692 ||  || — || November 12, 2002 || Socorro || LINEAR || — || align=right | 7.2 km || 
|-id=693 bgcolor=#d6d6d6
| 84693 ||  || — || November 12, 2002 || Socorro || LINEAR || EOS || align=right | 3.4 km || 
|-id=694 bgcolor=#E9E9E9
| 84694 ||  || — || November 12, 2002 || Socorro || LINEAR || — || align=right | 1.6 km || 
|-id=695 bgcolor=#E9E9E9
| 84695 ||  || — || November 12, 2002 || Socorro || LINEAR || — || align=right | 2.6 km || 
|-id=696 bgcolor=#d6d6d6
| 84696 ||  || — || November 12, 2002 || Socorro || LINEAR || — || align=right | 4.1 km || 
|-id=697 bgcolor=#fefefe
| 84697 ||  || — || November 12, 2002 || Socorro || LINEAR || — || align=right | 1.9 km || 
|-id=698 bgcolor=#d6d6d6
| 84698 ||  || — || November 12, 2002 || Socorro || LINEAR || — || align=right | 10 km || 
|-id=699 bgcolor=#E9E9E9
| 84699 ||  || — || November 12, 2002 || Socorro || LINEAR || — || align=right | 2.9 km || 
|-id=700 bgcolor=#E9E9E9
| 84700 ||  || — || November 13, 2002 || Palomar || NEAT || EUN || align=right | 2.7 km || 
|}

84701–84800 

|-bgcolor=#E9E9E9
| 84701 ||  || — || November 13, 2002 || Palomar || NEAT || — || align=right | 2.4 km || 
|-id=702 bgcolor=#E9E9E9
| 84702 ||  || — || November 13, 2002 || Palomar || NEAT || HOF || align=right | 5.5 km || 
|-id=703 bgcolor=#d6d6d6
| 84703 ||  || — || November 13, 2002 || Palomar || NEAT || HYG || align=right | 4.7 km || 
|-id=704 bgcolor=#d6d6d6
| 84704 ||  || — || November 11, 2002 || Anderson Mesa || LONEOS || — || align=right | 6.2 km || 
|-id=705 bgcolor=#E9E9E9
| 84705 ||  || — || November 13, 2002 || Palomar || NEAT || — || align=right | 4.8 km || 
|-id=706 bgcolor=#fefefe
| 84706 ||  || — || November 12, 2002 || Socorro || LINEAR || — || align=right | 2.1 km || 
|-id=707 bgcolor=#E9E9E9
| 84707 ||  || — || November 12, 2002 || Socorro || LINEAR || — || align=right | 5.4 km || 
|-id=708 bgcolor=#E9E9E9
| 84708 ||  || — || November 12, 2002 || Socorro || LINEAR || — || align=right | 4.6 km || 
|-id=709 bgcolor=#C2FFFF
| 84709 ||  || — || November 12, 2002 || Palomar || NEAT || L5 || align=right | 20 km || 
|-id=710 bgcolor=#E9E9E9
| 84710 ||  || — || November 12, 2002 || Palomar || NEAT || — || align=right | 5.2 km || 
|-id=711 bgcolor=#E9E9E9
| 84711 ||  || — || November 12, 2002 || Palomar || NEAT || — || align=right | 2.6 km || 
|-id=712 bgcolor=#E9E9E9
| 84712 ||  || — || November 13, 2002 || Palomar || NEAT || — || align=right | 2.8 km || 
|-id=713 bgcolor=#fefefe
| 84713 ||  || — || November 13, 2002 || Palomar || NEAT || — || align=right | 2.0 km || 
|-id=714 bgcolor=#E9E9E9
| 84714 ||  || — || November 13, 2002 || Palomar || NEAT || — || align=right | 2.4 km || 
|-id=715 bgcolor=#fefefe
| 84715 ||  || — || November 12, 2002 || Socorro || LINEAR || — || align=right | 1.6 km || 
|-id=716 bgcolor=#d6d6d6
| 84716 ||  || — || November 12, 2002 || Socorro || LINEAR || — || align=right | 7.0 km || 
|-id=717 bgcolor=#E9E9E9
| 84717 ||  || — || November 13, 2002 || Kingsnake || J. V. McClusky || — || align=right | 6.6 km || 
|-id=718 bgcolor=#E9E9E9
| 84718 ||  || — || November 14, 2002 || Socorro || LINEAR || — || align=right | 5.1 km || 
|-id=719 bgcolor=#C2E0FF
| 84719 ||  || — || November 3, 2002 || Palomar || C. Trujillo, M. E. Brown || plutino || align=right | 391 km || 
|-id=720 bgcolor=#d6d6d6
| 84720 ||  || — || November 23, 2002 || Palomar || NEAT || — || align=right | 5.9 km || 
|-id=721 bgcolor=#E9E9E9
| 84721 ||  || — || November 23, 2002 || Palomar || NEAT || — || align=right | 4.0 km || 
|-id=722 bgcolor=#E9E9E9
| 84722 ||  || — || November 23, 2002 || Kingsnake || J. V. McClusky || HNS || align=right | 3.6 km || 
|-id=723 bgcolor=#E9E9E9
| 84723 ||  || — || November 24, 2002 || Palomar || NEAT || — || align=right | 3.2 km || 
|-id=724 bgcolor=#d6d6d6
| 84724 ||  || — || November 24, 2002 || Palomar || NEAT || — || align=right | 4.1 km || 
|-id=725 bgcolor=#E9E9E9
| 84725 ||  || — || November 24, 2002 || Palomar || NEAT || HEN || align=right | 1.5 km || 
|-id=726 bgcolor=#d6d6d6
| 84726 ||  || — || November 24, 2002 || Palomar || NEAT || EOS || align=right | 4.4 km || 
|-id=727 bgcolor=#E9E9E9
| 84727 ||  || — || November 24, 2002 || Palomar || NEAT || — || align=right | 4.3 km || 
|-id=728 bgcolor=#d6d6d6
| 84728 ||  || — || November 24, 2002 || Palomar || NEAT || — || align=right | 4.8 km || 
|-id=729 bgcolor=#fefefe
| 84729 ||  || — || November 24, 2002 || Palomar || NEAT || V || align=right | 1.4 km || 
|-id=730 bgcolor=#E9E9E9
| 84730 ||  || — || November 24, 2002 || Palomar || NEAT || — || align=right | 2.2 km || 
|-id=731 bgcolor=#E9E9E9
| 84731 ||  || — || November 24, 2002 || Palomar || NEAT || — || align=right | 2.4 km || 
|-id=732 bgcolor=#fefefe
| 84732 ||  || — || November 25, 2002 || Palomar || NEAT || — || align=right | 1.9 km || 
|-id=733 bgcolor=#E9E9E9
| 84733 ||  || — || November 27, 2002 || Anderson Mesa || LONEOS || MAR || align=right | 2.4 km || 
|-id=734 bgcolor=#E9E9E9
| 84734 ||  || — || November 27, 2002 || Anderson Mesa || LONEOS || EUN || align=right | 2.6 km || 
|-id=735 bgcolor=#E9E9E9
| 84735 ||  || — || November 27, 2002 || Anderson Mesa || LONEOS || — || align=right | 2.2 km || 
|-id=736 bgcolor=#d6d6d6
| 84736 ||  || — || November 27, 2002 || Anderson Mesa || LONEOS || URS || align=right | 7.8 km || 
|-id=737 bgcolor=#fefefe
| 84737 ||  || — || November 28, 2002 || Anderson Mesa || LONEOS || H || align=right | 1.4 km || 
|-id=738 bgcolor=#d6d6d6
| 84738 ||  || — || November 30, 2002 || Socorro || LINEAR || — || align=right | 3.9 km || 
|-id=739 bgcolor=#E9E9E9
| 84739 ||  || — || November 28, 2002 || Anderson Mesa || LONEOS || — || align=right | 3.1 km || 
|-id=740 bgcolor=#E9E9E9
| 84740 ||  || — || November 28, 2002 || Anderson Mesa || LONEOS || — || align=right | 3.7 km || 
|-id=741 bgcolor=#E9E9E9
| 84741 ||  || — || November 28, 2002 || Haleakala || NEAT || — || align=right | 3.1 km || 
|-id=742 bgcolor=#fefefe
| 84742 ||  || — || November 28, 2002 || Haleakala || NEAT || V || align=right | 1.3 km || 
|-id=743 bgcolor=#d6d6d6
| 84743 ||  || — || December 1, 2002 || Socorro || LINEAR || HYG || align=right | 4.7 km || 
|-id=744 bgcolor=#d6d6d6
| 84744 ||  || — || December 1, 2002 || Socorro || LINEAR || TIR || align=right | 7.3 km || 
|-id=745 bgcolor=#E9E9E9
| 84745 ||  || — || December 3, 2002 || Palomar || NEAT || MAR || align=right | 4.0 km || 
|-id=746 bgcolor=#fefefe
| 84746 ||  || — || December 1, 2002 || Haleakala || NEAT || — || align=right | 1.4 km || 
|-id=747 bgcolor=#d6d6d6
| 84747 ||  || — || December 2, 2002 || Socorro || LINEAR || MEL || align=right | 8.4 km || 
|-id=748 bgcolor=#fefefe
| 84748 ||  || — || December 2, 2002 || Socorro || LINEAR || — || align=right | 1.6 km || 
|-id=749 bgcolor=#E9E9E9
| 84749 ||  || — || December 2, 2002 || Socorro || LINEAR || — || align=right | 5.5 km || 
|-id=750 bgcolor=#E9E9E9
| 84750 ||  || — || December 3, 2002 || Palomar || NEAT || EUN || align=right | 2.6 km || 
|-id=751 bgcolor=#fefefe
| 84751 ||  || — || December 3, 2002 || Palomar || NEAT || — || align=right | 2.6 km || 
|-id=752 bgcolor=#E9E9E9
| 84752 ||  || — || December 3, 2002 || Palomar || NEAT || — || align=right | 3.4 km || 
|-id=753 bgcolor=#fefefe
| 84753 ||  || — || December 3, 2002 || Palomar || NEAT || — || align=right | 2.1 km || 
|-id=754 bgcolor=#E9E9E9
| 84754 ||  || — || December 5, 2002 || Socorro || LINEAR || — || align=right | 2.9 km || 
|-id=755 bgcolor=#E9E9E9
| 84755 ||  || — || December 5, 2002 || Socorro || LINEAR || — || align=right | 6.3 km || 
|-id=756 bgcolor=#fefefe
| 84756 ||  || — || December 2, 2002 || Socorro || LINEAR || — || align=right | 2.0 km || 
|-id=757 bgcolor=#E9E9E9
| 84757 ||  || — || December 2, 2002 || Socorro || LINEAR || — || align=right | 2.6 km || 
|-id=758 bgcolor=#fefefe
| 84758 ||  || — || December 2, 2002 || Socorro || LINEAR || FLO || align=right | 1.6 km || 
|-id=759 bgcolor=#E9E9E9
| 84759 ||  || — || December 3, 2002 || Palomar || NEAT || ADE || align=right | 5.5 km || 
|-id=760 bgcolor=#E9E9E9
| 84760 ||  || — || December 3, 2002 || Mauna Kea || Mauna Kea Obs. || MRX || align=right | 2.1 km || 
|-id=761 bgcolor=#E9E9E9
| 84761 ||  || — || December 5, 2002 || Socorro || LINEAR || — || align=right | 2.2 km || 
|-id=762 bgcolor=#E9E9E9
| 84762 ||  || — || December 3, 2002 || Palomar || NEAT || MAR || align=right | 2.0 km || 
|-id=763 bgcolor=#E9E9E9
| 84763 ||  || — || December 3, 2002 || Palomar || NEAT || — || align=right | 3.8 km || 
|-id=764 bgcolor=#E9E9E9
| 84764 ||  || — || December 5, 2002 || Haleakala || NEAT || EUN || align=right | 3.1 km || 
|-id=765 bgcolor=#d6d6d6
| 84765 ||  || — || December 6, 2002 || Socorro || LINEAR || HYG || align=right | 3.8 km || 
|-id=766 bgcolor=#E9E9E9
| 84766 ||  || — || December 6, 2002 || Socorro || LINEAR || — || align=right | 2.7 km || 
|-id=767 bgcolor=#E9E9E9
| 84767 ||  || — || December 7, 2002 || Socorro || LINEAR || EUN || align=right | 2.4 km || 
|-id=768 bgcolor=#E9E9E9
| 84768 ||  || — || December 5, 2002 || Socorro || LINEAR || MRX || align=right | 2.4 km || 
|-id=769 bgcolor=#E9E9E9
| 84769 ||  || — || December 6, 2002 || Socorro || LINEAR || — || align=right | 3.5 km || 
|-id=770 bgcolor=#E9E9E9
| 84770 ||  || — || December 6, 2002 || Socorro || LINEAR || — || align=right | 3.5 km || 
|-id=771 bgcolor=#E9E9E9
| 84771 ||  || — || December 7, 2002 || Socorro || LINEAR || PAD || align=right | 3.8 km || 
|-id=772 bgcolor=#d6d6d6
| 84772 ||  || — || December 6, 2002 || Socorro || LINEAR || — || align=right | 5.9 km || 
|-id=773 bgcolor=#d6d6d6
| 84773 ||  || — || December 6, 2002 || Socorro || LINEAR || — || align=right | 8.8 km || 
|-id=774 bgcolor=#E9E9E9
| 84774 ||  || — || December 10, 2002 || Socorro || LINEAR || — || align=right | 3.3 km || 
|-id=775 bgcolor=#E9E9E9
| 84775 ||  || — || December 10, 2002 || Socorro || LINEAR || — || align=right | 4.3 km || 
|-id=776 bgcolor=#E9E9E9
| 84776 ||  || — || December 10, 2002 || Socorro || LINEAR || — || align=right | 4.8 km || 
|-id=777 bgcolor=#fefefe
| 84777 ||  || — || December 10, 2002 || Socorro || LINEAR || V || align=right | 1.5 km || 
|-id=778 bgcolor=#fefefe
| 84778 ||  || — || December 10, 2002 || Tebbutt || F. B. Zoltowski || — || align=right | 2.4 km || 
|-id=779 bgcolor=#E9E9E9
| 84779 ||  || — || December 10, 2002 || Socorro || LINEAR || — || align=right | 5.1 km || 
|-id=780 bgcolor=#fefefe
| 84780 ||  || — || December 10, 2002 || Socorro || LINEAR || — || align=right | 2.0 km || 
|-id=781 bgcolor=#E9E9E9
| 84781 ||  || — || December 10, 2002 || Socorro || LINEAR || — || align=right | 4.7 km || 
|-id=782 bgcolor=#fefefe
| 84782 ||  || — || December 11, 2002 || Socorro || LINEAR || — || align=right | 2.2 km || 
|-id=783 bgcolor=#fefefe
| 84783 ||  || — || December 11, 2002 || Socorro || LINEAR || V || align=right | 1.8 km || 
|-id=784 bgcolor=#d6d6d6
| 84784 ||  || — || December 11, 2002 || Socorro || LINEAR || — || align=right | 6.2 km || 
|-id=785 bgcolor=#fefefe
| 84785 ||  || — || December 11, 2002 || Socorro || LINEAR || V || align=right | 1.7 km || 
|-id=786 bgcolor=#fefefe
| 84786 ||  || — || December 11, 2002 || Socorro || LINEAR || V || align=right | 1.4 km || 
|-id=787 bgcolor=#d6d6d6
| 84787 ||  || — || December 11, 2002 || Socorro || LINEAR || ALA || align=right | 8.7 km || 
|-id=788 bgcolor=#d6d6d6
| 84788 ||  || — || December 11, 2002 || Socorro || LINEAR || HYG || align=right | 6.2 km || 
|-id=789 bgcolor=#E9E9E9
| 84789 ||  || — || December 13, 2002 || Socorro || LINEAR || — || align=right | 2.8 km || 
|-id=790 bgcolor=#d6d6d6
| 84790 ||  || — || December 13, 2002 || Palomar || NEAT || BRA || align=right | 3.5 km || 
|-id=791 bgcolor=#E9E9E9
| 84791 ||  || — || December 11, 2002 || Socorro || LINEAR || — || align=right | 3.9 km || 
|-id=792 bgcolor=#fefefe
| 84792 ||  || — || December 11, 2002 || Socorro || LINEAR || FLO || align=right | 1.9 km || 
|-id=793 bgcolor=#fefefe
| 84793 ||  || — || December 11, 2002 || Socorro || LINEAR || — || align=right | 1.7 km || 
|-id=794 bgcolor=#E9E9E9
| 84794 ||  || — || December 12, 2002 || Socorro || LINEAR || EUN || align=right | 3.2 km || 
|-id=795 bgcolor=#d6d6d6
| 84795 ||  || — || December 9, 2002 || Bergisch Gladbach || W. Bickel || — || align=right | 5.4 km || 
|-id=796 bgcolor=#E9E9E9
| 84796 ||  || — || December 14, 2002 || Socorro || LINEAR || — || align=right | 5.0 km || 
|-id=797 bgcolor=#E9E9E9
| 84797 ||  || — || December 15, 2002 || Haleakala || NEAT || — || align=right | 5.3 km || 
|-id=798 bgcolor=#fefefe
| 84798 ||  || — || December 4, 2002 || Kitt Peak || M. W. Buie || — || align=right | 2.6 km || 
|-id=799 bgcolor=#fefefe
| 84799 ||  || — || December 5, 2002 || Socorro || LINEAR || FLO || align=right | 1.5 km || 
|-id=800 bgcolor=#d6d6d6
| 84800 ||  || — || December 5, 2002 || Socorro || LINEAR || — || align=right | 4.9 km || 
|}

84801–84900 

|-bgcolor=#d6d6d6
| 84801 ||  || — || December 5, 2002 || Socorro || LINEAR || — || align=right | 4.6 km || 
|-id=802 bgcolor=#fefefe
| 84802 ||  || — || December 27, 2002 || Anderson Mesa || LONEOS || — || align=right | 2.6 km || 
|-id=803 bgcolor=#d6d6d6
| 84803 ||  || — || December 28, 2002 || Kitt Peak || Spacewatch || HYG || align=right | 5.7 km || 
|-id=804 bgcolor=#E9E9E9
| 84804 ||  || — || December 31, 2002 || Socorro || LINEAR || — || align=right | 2.9 km || 
|-id=805 bgcolor=#d6d6d6
| 84805 ||  || — || December 31, 2002 || Socorro || LINEAR || — || align=right | 4.3 km || 
|-id=806 bgcolor=#d6d6d6
| 84806 ||  || — || December 31, 2002 || Socorro || LINEAR || — || align=right | 5.7 km || 
|-id=807 bgcolor=#d6d6d6
| 84807 ||  || — || December 31, 2002 || Anderson Mesa || LONEOS || THM || align=right | 7.3 km || 
|-id=808 bgcolor=#d6d6d6
| 84808 ||  || — || December 31, 2002 || Socorro || LINEAR || EOS || align=right | 3.6 km || 
|-id=809 bgcolor=#fefefe
| 84809 ||  || — || December 31, 2002 || Socorro || LINEAR || — || align=right | 1.8 km || 
|-id=810 bgcolor=#d6d6d6
| 84810 ||  || — || December 31, 2002 || Socorro || LINEAR || — || align=right | 4.7 km || 
|-id=811 bgcolor=#E9E9E9
| 84811 ||  || — || December 31, 2002 || Socorro || LINEAR || AGN || align=right | 2.6 km || 
|-id=812 bgcolor=#d6d6d6
| 84812 ||  || — || December 31, 2002 || Socorro || LINEAR || KOR || align=right | 3.0 km || 
|-id=813 bgcolor=#E9E9E9
| 84813 ||  || — || December 31, 2002 || Socorro || LINEAR || AST || align=right | 4.3 km || 
|-id=814 bgcolor=#fefefe
| 84814 ||  || — || December 31, 2002 || Socorro || LINEAR || — || align=right | 2.0 km || 
|-id=815 bgcolor=#fefefe
| 84815 ||  || — || December 31, 2002 || Socorro || LINEAR || — || align=right | 1.6 km || 
|-id=816 bgcolor=#E9E9E9
| 84816 ||  || — || December 31, 2002 || Socorro || LINEAR || — || align=right | 4.0 km || 
|-id=817 bgcolor=#E9E9E9
| 84817 ||  || — || December 31, 2002 || Socorro || LINEAR || — || align=right | 3.1 km || 
|-id=818 bgcolor=#E9E9E9
| 84818 ||  || — || December 31, 2002 || Socorro || LINEAR || — || align=right | 2.3 km || 
|-id=819 bgcolor=#d6d6d6
| 84819 ||  || — || December 31, 2002 || Socorro || LINEAR || THM || align=right | 5.1 km || 
|-id=820 bgcolor=#E9E9E9
| 84820 ||  || — || December 31, 2002 || Socorro || LINEAR || HEN || align=right | 1.9 km || 
|-id=821 bgcolor=#fefefe
| 84821 ||  || — || December 31, 2002 || Socorro || LINEAR || — || align=right | 2.1 km || 
|-id=822 bgcolor=#fefefe
| 84822 ||  || — || December 31, 2002 || Socorro || LINEAR || V || align=right | 2.0 km || 
|-id=823 bgcolor=#d6d6d6
| 84823 ||  || — || December 31, 2002 || Socorro || LINEAR || — || align=right | 6.9 km || 
|-id=824 bgcolor=#E9E9E9
| 84824 ||  || — || December 31, 2002 || Socorro || LINEAR || — || align=right | 1.8 km || 
|-id=825 bgcolor=#fefefe
| 84825 ||  || — || December 31, 2002 || Socorro || LINEAR || EUT || align=right | 1.7 km || 
|-id=826 bgcolor=#E9E9E9
| 84826 ||  || — || December 31, 2002 || Socorro || LINEAR || — || align=right | 2.2 km || 
|-id=827 bgcolor=#E9E9E9
| 84827 || 2003 AC || — || January 1, 2003 || Socorro || LINEAR || — || align=right | 7.0 km || 
|-id=828 bgcolor=#E9E9E9
| 84828 || 2003 AL || — || January 1, 2003 || Socorro || LINEAR || — || align=right | 6.1 km || 
|-id=829 bgcolor=#d6d6d6
| 84829 || 2003 AN || — || January 1, 2003 || Socorro || LINEAR || TIR || align=right | 5.8 km || 
|-id=830 bgcolor=#E9E9E9
| 84830 ||  || — || January 1, 2003 || Kingsnake || J. V. McClusky || EUN || align=right | 2.4 km || 
|-id=831 bgcolor=#d6d6d6
| 84831 ||  || — || January 1, 2003 || Socorro || LINEAR || EOS || align=right | 4.2 km || 
|-id=832 bgcolor=#E9E9E9
| 84832 ||  || — || January 3, 2003 || Socorro || LINEAR || — || align=right | 5.5 km || 
|-id=833 bgcolor=#fefefe
| 84833 ||  || — || January 4, 2003 || Socorro || LINEAR || PHO || align=right | 3.5 km || 
|-id=834 bgcolor=#E9E9E9
| 84834 ||  || — || January 1, 2003 || Socorro || LINEAR || GEF || align=right | 2.7 km || 
|-id=835 bgcolor=#d6d6d6
| 84835 ||  || — || January 1, 2003 || Socorro || LINEAR || ALA || align=right | 9.9 km || 
|-id=836 bgcolor=#d6d6d6
| 84836 ||  || — || January 1, 2003 || Socorro || LINEAR || EOS || align=right | 4.3 km || 
|-id=837 bgcolor=#E9E9E9
| 84837 ||  || — || January 1, 2003 || Socorro || LINEAR || — || align=right | 6.7 km || 
|-id=838 bgcolor=#E9E9E9
| 84838 ||  || — || January 1, 2003 || Socorro || LINEAR || — || align=right | 6.1 km || 
|-id=839 bgcolor=#E9E9E9
| 84839 ||  || — || January 1, 2003 || Socorro || LINEAR || — || align=right | 3.8 km || 
|-id=840 bgcolor=#fefefe
| 84840 ||  || — || January 1, 2003 || Socorro || LINEAR || V || align=right | 1.9 km || 
|-id=841 bgcolor=#d6d6d6
| 84841 ||  || — || January 2, 2003 || Socorro || LINEAR || — || align=right | 6.6 km || 
|-id=842 bgcolor=#d6d6d6
| 84842 ||  || — || January 5, 2003 || Anderson Mesa || LONEOS || URS || align=right | 6.3 km || 
|-id=843 bgcolor=#d6d6d6
| 84843 ||  || — || January 5, 2003 || Socorro || LINEAR || ALA || align=right | 7.6 km || 
|-id=844 bgcolor=#E9E9E9
| 84844 ||  || — || January 5, 2003 || Socorro || LINEAR || GEF || align=right | 2.7 km || 
|-id=845 bgcolor=#E9E9E9
| 84845 ||  || — || January 7, 2003 || Socorro || LINEAR || — || align=right | 4.8 km || 
|-id=846 bgcolor=#E9E9E9
| 84846 ||  || — || January 4, 2003 || Socorro || LINEAR || — || align=right | 3.6 km || 
|-id=847 bgcolor=#d6d6d6
| 84847 ||  || — || January 4, 2003 || Socorro || LINEAR || — || align=right | 5.7 km || 
|-id=848 bgcolor=#fefefe
| 84848 ||  || — || January 5, 2003 || Socorro || LINEAR || V || align=right | 1.8 km || 
|-id=849 bgcolor=#E9E9E9
| 84849 ||  || — || January 7, 2003 || Socorro || LINEAR || EUN || align=right | 3.1 km || 
|-id=850 bgcolor=#fefefe
| 84850 ||  || — || January 7, 2003 || Socorro || LINEAR || V || align=right | 2.0 km || 
|-id=851 bgcolor=#fefefe
| 84851 ||  || — || January 7, 2003 || Socorro || LINEAR || PHO || align=right | 3.3 km || 
|-id=852 bgcolor=#d6d6d6
| 84852 ||  || — || January 7, 2003 || Socorro || LINEAR || EMA || align=right | 7.6 km || 
|-id=853 bgcolor=#d6d6d6
| 84853 ||  || — || January 7, 2003 || Socorro || LINEAR || — || align=right | 9.2 km || 
|-id=854 bgcolor=#fefefe
| 84854 ||  || — || January 5, 2003 || Socorro || LINEAR || NYS || align=right | 1.7 km || 
|-id=855 bgcolor=#fefefe
| 84855 ||  || — || January 5, 2003 || Socorro || LINEAR || — || align=right | 2.4 km || 
|-id=856 bgcolor=#d6d6d6
| 84856 ||  || — || January 5, 2003 || Socorro || LINEAR || — || align=right | 11 km || 
|-id=857 bgcolor=#E9E9E9
| 84857 ||  || — || January 5, 2003 || Socorro || LINEAR || POS || align=right | 7.5 km || 
|-id=858 bgcolor=#d6d6d6
| 84858 ||  || — || January 5, 2003 || Socorro || LINEAR || — || align=right | 5.9 km || 
|-id=859 bgcolor=#fefefe
| 84859 ||  || — || January 7, 2003 || Socorro || LINEAR || — || align=right | 2.3 km || 
|-id=860 bgcolor=#E9E9E9
| 84860 ||  || — || January 7, 2003 || Socorro || LINEAR || — || align=right | 5.8 km || 
|-id=861 bgcolor=#E9E9E9
| 84861 ||  || — || January 11, 2003 || Socorro || LINEAR || — || align=right | 4.6 km || 
|-id=862 bgcolor=#fefefe
| 84862 ||  || — || January 10, 2003 || Socorro || LINEAR || — || align=right | 2.2 km || 
|-id=863 bgcolor=#d6d6d6
| 84863 ||  || — || January 10, 2003 || Socorro || LINEAR || — || align=right | 8.4 km || 
|-id=864 bgcolor=#E9E9E9
| 84864 ||  || — || January 11, 2003 || Goodricke-Pigott || R. A. Tucker || — || align=right | 2.7 km || 
|-id=865 bgcolor=#E9E9E9
| 84865 ||  || — || January 26, 2003 || Anderson Mesa || LONEOS || — || align=right | 3.1 km || 
|-id=866 bgcolor=#d6d6d6
| 84866 ||  || — || January 26, 2003 || Anderson Mesa || LONEOS || — || align=right | 7.9 km || 
|-id=867 bgcolor=#d6d6d6
| 84867 ||  || — || January 26, 2003 || Palomar || NEAT || — || align=right | 6.4 km || 
|-id=868 bgcolor=#E9E9E9
| 84868 ||  || — || January 27, 2003 || Socorro || LINEAR || — || align=right | 2.9 km || 
|-id=869 bgcolor=#d6d6d6
| 84869 ||  || — || January 25, 2003 || Palomar || NEAT || — || align=right | 6.6 km || 
|-id=870 bgcolor=#d6d6d6
| 84870 ||  || — || January 25, 2003 || Palomar || NEAT || — || align=right | 7.2 km || 
|-id=871 bgcolor=#E9E9E9
| 84871 ||  || — || January 27, 2003 || Anderson Mesa || LONEOS || — || align=right | 2.2 km || 
|-id=872 bgcolor=#d6d6d6
| 84872 ||  || — || January 27, 2003 || Socorro || LINEAR || — || align=right | 5.6 km || 
|-id=873 bgcolor=#d6d6d6
| 84873 ||  || — || January 28, 2003 || Socorro || LINEAR || 7:4 || align=right | 9.3 km || 
|-id=874 bgcolor=#d6d6d6
| 84874 ||  || — || January 29, 2003 || Palomar || NEAT || — || align=right | 7.0 km || 
|-id=875 bgcolor=#d6d6d6
| 84875 ||  || — || January 28, 2003 || Haleakala || NEAT || — || align=right | 7.6 km || 
|-id=876 bgcolor=#d6d6d6
| 84876 ||  || — || January 28, 2003 || Socorro || LINEAR || — || align=right | 10 km || 
|-id=877 bgcolor=#fefefe
| 84877 ||  || — || January 31, 2003 || Socorro || LINEAR || ERI || align=right | 5.7 km || 
|-id=878 bgcolor=#E9E9E9
| 84878 ||  || — || January 28, 2003 || Socorro || LINEAR || — || align=right | 2.6 km || 
|-id=879 bgcolor=#d6d6d6
| 84879 ||  || — || January 28, 2003 || Socorro || LINEAR || — || align=right | 4.1 km || 
|-id=880 bgcolor=#E9E9E9
| 84880 ||  || — || February 1, 2003 || Socorro || LINEAR || — || align=right | 4.1 km || 
|-id=881 bgcolor=#d6d6d6
| 84881 ||  || — || February 4, 2003 || Palomar || NEAT || LUT || align=right | 7.2 km || 
|-id=882 bgcolor=#E9E9E9
| 84882 Table Mountain ||  ||  || February 1, 2003 || Wrightwood || J. W. Young || — || align=right | 3.0 km || 
|-id=883 bgcolor=#d6d6d6
| 84883 ||  || — || February 28, 2003 || Socorro || LINEAR || — || align=right | 4.8 km || 
|-id=884 bgcolor=#d6d6d6
| 84884 Dorismcmillan ||  ||  || March 23, 2003 || Catalina || CSS || — || align=right | 8.0 km || 
|-id=885 bgcolor=#fefefe
| 84885 ||  || — || March 23, 2003 || Kitt Peak || Spacewatch || — || align=right | 1.6 km || 
|-id=886 bgcolor=#E9E9E9
| 84886 ||  || — || March 31, 2003 || Anderson Mesa || LONEOS || — || align=right | 3.3 km || 
|-id=887 bgcolor=#d6d6d6
| 84887 ||  || — || April 24, 2003 || Anderson Mesa || LONEOS || KOR || align=right | 2.5 km || 
|-id=888 bgcolor=#d6d6d6
| 84888 ||  || — || June 28, 2003 || Socorro || LINEAR || EOS || align=right | 3.7 km || 
|-id=889 bgcolor=#d6d6d6
| 84889 ||  || — || July 2, 2003 || Socorro || LINEAR || — || align=right | 5.4 km || 
|-id=890 bgcolor=#fefefe
| 84890 ||  || — || July 2, 2003 || Anderson Mesa || LONEOS || H || align=right | 4.2 km || 
|-id=891 bgcolor=#fefefe
| 84891 ||  || — || July 21, 2003 || Palomar || NEAT || PHO || align=right | 2.4 km || 
|-id=892 bgcolor=#d6d6d6
| 84892 ||  || — || August 24, 2003 || Socorro || LINEAR || THB || align=right | 9.0 km || 
|-id=893 bgcolor=#d6d6d6
| 84893 ||  || — || September 19, 2003 || Kitt Peak || Spacewatch || — || align=right | 4.3 km || 
|-id=894 bgcolor=#d6d6d6
| 84894 ||  || — || September 20, 2003 || Socorro || LINEAR || — || align=right | 7.2 km || 
|-id=895 bgcolor=#d6d6d6
| 84895 ||  || — || September 26, 2003 || Socorro || LINEAR || — || align=right | 5.7 km || 
|-id=896 bgcolor=#d6d6d6
| 84896 ||  || — || September 26, 2003 || Socorro || LINEAR || — || align=right | 4.3 km || 
|-id=897 bgcolor=#E9E9E9
| 84897 ||  || — || September 29, 2003 || Anderson Mesa || LONEOS || — || align=right | 3.7 km || 
|-id=898 bgcolor=#d6d6d6
| 84898 ||  || — || September 29, 2003 || Anderson Mesa || LONEOS || EUP || align=right | 9.9 km || 
|-id=899 bgcolor=#E9E9E9
| 84899 ||  || — || September 29, 2003 || Socorro || LINEAR || — || align=right | 3.1 km || 
|-id=900 bgcolor=#E9E9E9
| 84900 ||  || — || September 30, 2003 || Socorro || LINEAR || ADE || align=right | 7.1 km || 
|}

84901–85000 

|-bgcolor=#E9E9E9
| 84901 ||  || — || October 15, 2003 || Socorro || LINEAR || HNS || align=right | 4.0 km || 
|-id=902 bgcolor=#d6d6d6
| 84902 Porrentruy ||  ||  || October 17, 2003 || Vicques || M. Ory || THM || align=right | 8.1 km || 
|-id=903 bgcolor=#d6d6d6
| 84903 ||  || — || October 17, 2003 || Kitt Peak || Spacewatch || — || align=right | 5.0 km || 
|-id=904 bgcolor=#d6d6d6
| 84904 ||  || — || October 24, 2003 || Socorro || LINEAR || EOS || align=right | 4.2 km || 
|-id=905 bgcolor=#d6d6d6
| 84905 ||  || — || October 19, 2003 || Anderson Mesa || LONEOS || 7:4 || align=right | 8.6 km || 
|-id=906 bgcolor=#d6d6d6
| 84906 ||  || — || October 19, 2003 || Palomar || NEAT || — || align=right | 6.3 km || 
|-id=907 bgcolor=#d6d6d6
| 84907 ||  || — || October 21, 2003 || Socorro || LINEAR || — || align=right | 5.4 km || 
|-id=908 bgcolor=#E9E9E9
| 84908 ||  || — || October 21, 2003 || Anderson Mesa || LONEOS || — || align=right | 6.4 km || 
|-id=909 bgcolor=#E9E9E9
| 84909 ||  || — || October 21, 2003 || Anderson Mesa || LONEOS || — || align=right | 2.7 km || 
|-id=910 bgcolor=#E9E9E9
| 84910 ||  || — || October 22, 2003 || Socorro || LINEAR || IAN || align=right | 2.1 km || 
|-id=911 bgcolor=#d6d6d6
| 84911 ||  || — || October 22, 2003 || Anderson Mesa || LONEOS || — || align=right | 7.1 km || 
|-id=912 bgcolor=#E9E9E9
| 84912 ||  || — || October 22, 2003 || Socorro || LINEAR || MIT || align=right | 9.8 km || 
|-id=913 bgcolor=#d6d6d6
| 84913 ||  || — || October 22, 2003 || Socorro || LINEAR || — || align=right | 7.1 km || 
|-id=914 bgcolor=#E9E9E9
| 84914 ||  || — || October 24, 2003 || Kitt Peak || Spacewatch || — || align=right | 5.7 km || 
|-id=915 bgcolor=#d6d6d6
| 84915 ||  || — || October 24, 2003 || Kitt Peak || Spacewatch || — || align=right | 8.3 km || 
|-id=916 bgcolor=#E9E9E9
| 84916 ||  || — || October 25, 2003 || Kitt Peak || Spacewatch || GEF || align=right | 3.1 km || 
|-id=917 bgcolor=#fefefe
| 84917 ||  || — || October 25, 2003 || Socorro || LINEAR || NYS || align=right | 1.7 km || 
|-id=918 bgcolor=#E9E9E9
| 84918 ||  || — || October 25, 2003 || Socorro || LINEAR || INO || align=right | 3.4 km || 
|-id=919 bgcolor=#E9E9E9
| 84919 Karinthy || 2003 VH ||  || November 3, 2003 || Piszkéstető || K. Sárneczky, S. Mészáros || — || align=right | 5.7 km || 
|-id=920 bgcolor=#E9E9E9
| 84920 ||  || — || November 6, 2003 || Ondřejov || J. Manek || EUN || align=right | 3.0 km || 
|-id=921 bgcolor=#E9E9E9
| 84921 Morkoláb ||  ||  || November 9, 2003 || Piszkéstető || K. Sárneczky, B. Sipőcz || — || align=right | 3.9 km || 
|-id=922 bgcolor=#C2E0FF
| 84922 ||  || — || November 14, 2003 || Palomar || NEAT || plutino || align=right | 712 km || 
|-id=923 bgcolor=#E9E9E9
| 84923 ||  || — || November 14, 2003 || Palomar || NEAT || — || align=right | 2.5 km || 
|-id=924 bgcolor=#E9E9E9
| 84924 ||  || — || November 15, 2003 || Goodricke-Pigott || R. A. Tucker || EUN || align=right | 3.2 km || 
|-id=925 bgcolor=#fefefe
| 84925 ||  || — || November 15, 2003 || Palomar || NEAT || — || align=right | 3.4 km || 
|-id=926 bgcolor=#E9E9E9
| 84926 Marywalker ||  ||  || November 16, 2003 || Catalina || CSS || — || align=right | 4.7 km || 
|-id=927 bgcolor=#E9E9E9
| 84927 ||  || — || November 18, 2003 || Kitt Peak || Spacewatch || — || align=right | 6.6 km || 
|-id=928 bgcolor=#d6d6d6
| 84928 Oliversacks ||  ||  || November 16, 2003 || Catalina || CSS || KOR || align=right | 2.7 km || 
|-id=929 bgcolor=#d6d6d6
| 84929 ||  || — || November 19, 2003 || Socorro || LINEAR || EOS || align=right | 4.3 km || 
|-id=930 bgcolor=#d6d6d6
| 84930 ||  || — || November 21, 2003 || Palomar || NEAT || — || align=right | 11 km || 
|-id=931 bgcolor=#d6d6d6
| 84931 ||  || — || November 20, 2003 || Socorro || LINEAR || — || align=right | 8.3 km || 
|-id=932 bgcolor=#E9E9E9
| 84932 ||  || — || November 19, 2003 || Socorro || LINEAR || — || align=right | 4.4 km || 
|-id=933 bgcolor=#E9E9E9
| 84933 ||  || — || November 19, 2003 || Socorro || LINEAR || EUN || align=right | 3.7 km || 
|-id=934 bgcolor=#d6d6d6
| 84934 ||  || — || November 20, 2003 || Socorro || LINEAR || — || align=right | 4.9 km || 
|-id=935 bgcolor=#fefefe
| 84935 ||  || — || November 22, 2003 || Socorro || LINEAR || NYS || align=right | 1.4 km || 
|-id=936 bgcolor=#E9E9E9
| 84936 ||  || — || November 20, 2003 || Socorro || LINEAR || GEF || align=right | 2.3 km || 
|-id=937 bgcolor=#fefefe
| 84937 ||  || — || November 20, 2003 || Socorro || LINEAR || — || align=right | 1.4 km || 
|-id=938 bgcolor=#E9E9E9
| 84938 ||  || — || November 20, 2003 || Socorro || LINEAR || — || align=right | 5.7 km || 
|-id=939 bgcolor=#E9E9E9
| 84939 ||  || — || November 21, 2003 || Socorro || LINEAR || — || align=right | 3.5 km || 
|-id=940 bgcolor=#d6d6d6
| 84940 ||  || — || November 21, 2003 || Socorro || LINEAR || — || align=right | 4.4 km || 
|-id=941 bgcolor=#E9E9E9
| 84941 ||  || — || November 21, 2003 || Socorro || LINEAR || DOR || align=right | 5.7 km || 
|-id=942 bgcolor=#fefefe
| 84942 ||  || — || November 21, 2003 || Socorro || LINEAR || — || align=right | 1.8 km || 
|-id=943 bgcolor=#fefefe
| 84943 Timothylinn ||  ||  || November 23, 2003 || Catalina || CSS || — || align=right | 4.3 km || 
|-id=944 bgcolor=#d6d6d6
| 84944 ||  || — || November 26, 2003 || Anderson Mesa || LONEOS || — || align=right | 6.5 km || 
|-id=945 bgcolor=#E9E9E9
| 84945 Solosky ||  ||  || November 27, 2003 || Catalina || CSS || — || align=right | 4.0 km || 
|-id=946 bgcolor=#d6d6d6
| 84946 ||  || — || November 30, 2003 || Socorro || LINEAR || — || align=right | 11 km || 
|-id=947 bgcolor=#E9E9E9
| 84947 ||  || — || November 19, 2003 || Socorro || LINEAR || — || align=right | 3.1 km || 
|-id=948 bgcolor=#E9E9E9
| 84948 ||  || — || November 20, 2003 || Socorro || LINEAR || — || align=right | 4.7 km || 
|-id=949 bgcolor=#E9E9E9
| 84949 ||  || — || November 21, 2003 || Anderson Mesa || LONEOS || — || align=right | 4.1 km || 
|-id=950 bgcolor=#E9E9E9
| 84950 ||  || — || December 1, 2003 || Socorro || LINEAR || PAE || align=right | 6.9 km || 
|-id=951 bgcolor=#E9E9E9
| 84951 Kenwilson ||  ||  || December 1, 2003 || Catalina || CSS || MAR || align=right | 4.0 km || 
|-id=952 bgcolor=#E9E9E9
| 84952 ||  || — || December 1, 2003 || Socorro || LINEAR || — || align=right | 4.1 km || 
|-id=953 bgcolor=#E9E9E9
| 84953 ||  || — || December 1, 2003 || Socorro || LINEAR || EUN || align=right | 6.1 km || 
|-id=954 bgcolor=#E9E9E9
| 84954 ||  || — || December 3, 2003 || Socorro || LINEAR || — || align=right | 8.0 km || 
|-id=955 bgcolor=#E9E9E9
| 84955 ||  || — || December 4, 2003 || Socorro || LINEAR || — || align=right | 4.8 km || 
|-id=956 bgcolor=#E9E9E9
| 84956 ||  || — || December 12, 2003 || Palomar || NEAT || — || align=right | 2.9 km || 
|-id=957 bgcolor=#d6d6d6
| 84957 ||  || — || December 14, 2003 || Palomar || NEAT || LAU || align=right | 2.7 km || 
|-id=958 bgcolor=#E9E9E9
| 84958 ||  || — || December 14, 2003 || Palomar || NEAT || — || align=right | 4.6 km || 
|-id=959 bgcolor=#E9E9E9
| 84959 ||  || — || December 14, 2003 || Kitt Peak || Spacewatch || ADE || align=right | 7.8 km || 
|-id=960 bgcolor=#fefefe
| 84960 ||  || — || December 14, 2003 || Kitt Peak || Spacewatch || — || align=right | 2.3 km || 
|-id=961 bgcolor=#E9E9E9
| 84961 ||  || — || December 15, 2003 || Palomar || NEAT || — || align=right | 3.4 km || 
|-id=962 bgcolor=#d6d6d6
| 84962 ||  || — || December 17, 2003 || Črni Vrh || Črni Vrh || — || align=right | 11 km || 
|-id=963 bgcolor=#E9E9E9
| 84963 ||  || — || December 17, 2003 || Anderson Mesa || LONEOS || — || align=right | 4.0 km || 
|-id=964 bgcolor=#E9E9E9
| 84964 ||  || — || December 17, 2003 || Socorro || LINEAR || — || align=right | 4.1 km || 
|-id=965 bgcolor=#E9E9E9
| 84965 ||  || — || December 17, 2003 || Palomar || NEAT || — || align=right | 6.3 km || 
|-id=966 bgcolor=#d6d6d6
| 84966 ||  || — || December 17, 2003 || Palomar || NEAT || TIR || align=right | 8.0 km || 
|-id=967 bgcolor=#E9E9E9
| 84967 ||  || — || December 17, 2003 || Palomar || NEAT || — || align=right | 5.7 km || 
|-id=968 bgcolor=#fefefe
| 84968 ||  || — || December 16, 2003 || Anderson Mesa || LONEOS || — || align=right | 1.5 km || 
|-id=969 bgcolor=#d6d6d6
| 84969 ||  || — || December 16, 2003 || Anderson Mesa || LONEOS || — || align=right | 6.3 km || 
|-id=970 bgcolor=#fefefe
| 84970 ||  || — || December 16, 2003 || Anderson Mesa || LONEOS || V || align=right | 1.5 km || 
|-id=971 bgcolor=#fefefe
| 84971 ||  || — || December 17, 2003 || Socorro || LINEAR || KLI || align=right | 4.3 km || 
|-id=972 bgcolor=#d6d6d6
| 84972 ||  || — || December 17, 2003 || Palomar || NEAT || EUP || align=right | 8.1 km || 
|-id=973 bgcolor=#d6d6d6
| 84973 ||  || — || December 17, 2003 || Kitt Peak || Spacewatch || THM || align=right | 6.0 km || 
|-id=974 bgcolor=#fefefe
| 84974 ||  || — || December 19, 2003 || Socorro || LINEAR || — || align=right | 1.8 km || 
|-id=975 bgcolor=#fefefe
| 84975 ||  || — || December 19, 2003 || Socorro || LINEAR || — || align=right | 1.8 km || 
|-id=976 bgcolor=#d6d6d6
| 84976 ||  || — || December 19, 2003 || Socorro || LINEAR || HYG || align=right | 7.1 km || 
|-id=977 bgcolor=#d6d6d6
| 84977 ||  || — || December 19, 2003 || Socorro || LINEAR || KOR || align=right | 3.5 km || 
|-id=978 bgcolor=#E9E9E9
| 84978 ||  || — || December 19, 2003 || Socorro || LINEAR || — || align=right | 4.3 km || 
|-id=979 bgcolor=#fefefe
| 84979 ||  || — || December 19, 2003 || Socorro || LINEAR || FLO || align=right | 1.3 km || 
|-id=980 bgcolor=#d6d6d6
| 84980 ||  || — || December 19, 2003 || Socorro || LINEAR || — || align=right | 7.0 km || 
|-id=981 bgcolor=#d6d6d6
| 84981 ||  || — || December 19, 2003 || Socorro || LINEAR || — || align=right | 6.7 km || 
|-id=982 bgcolor=#E9E9E9
| 84982 ||  || — || December 19, 2003 || Socorro || LINEAR || — || align=right | 4.7 km || 
|-id=983 bgcolor=#fefefe
| 84983 ||  || — || December 19, 2003 || Socorro || LINEAR || — || align=right | 1.6 km || 
|-id=984 bgcolor=#fefefe
| 84984 ||  || — || December 20, 2003 || Socorro || LINEAR || V || align=right | 1.5 km || 
|-id=985 bgcolor=#E9E9E9
| 84985 ||  || — || December 20, 2003 || Socorro || LINEAR || POS || align=right | 6.4 km || 
|-id=986 bgcolor=#fefefe
| 84986 ||  || — || December 18, 2003 || Kitt Peak || Spacewatch || — || align=right | 2.5 km || 
|-id=987 bgcolor=#E9E9E9
| 84987 ||  || — || December 18, 2003 || Črni Vrh || Črni Vrh || — || align=right | 4.2 km || 
|-id=988 bgcolor=#d6d6d6
| 84988 ||  || — || December 19, 2003 || Socorro || LINEAR || — || align=right | 7.7 km || 
|-id=989 bgcolor=#fefefe
| 84989 ||  || — || December 19, 2003 || Socorro || LINEAR || V || align=right | 1.3 km || 
|-id=990 bgcolor=#E9E9E9
| 84990 ||  || — || December 19, 2003 || Kitt Peak || Spacewatch || — || align=right | 2.9 km || 
|-id=991 bgcolor=#E9E9E9
| 84991 Bettyphilpotts ||  ||  || December 22, 2003 || Catalina || CSS || — || align=right | 3.5 km || 
|-id=992 bgcolor=#d6d6d6
| 84992 ||  || — || December 19, 2003 || Socorro || LINEAR || EOS || align=right | 4.2 km || 
|-id=993 bgcolor=#fefefe
| 84993 ||  || — || December 19, 2003 || Socorro || LINEAR || — || align=right | 1.9 km || 
|-id=994 bgcolor=#E9E9E9
| 84994 Amysimon ||  ||  || December 22, 2003 || Catalina || CSS || — || align=right | 6.1 km || 
|-id=995 bgcolor=#d6d6d6
| 84995 Zselic ||  ||  || December 26, 2003 || Piszkéstető || K. Sárneczky || — || align=right | 4.1 km || 
|-id=996 bgcolor=#d6d6d6
| 84996 Hortobágy ||  ||  || December 26, 2003 || Piszkéstető || K. Sárneczky || — || align=right | 5.3 km || 
|-id=997 bgcolor=#E9E9E9
| 84997 ||  || — || December 27, 2003 || Kitt Peak || Spacewatch || — || align=right | 4.0 km || 
|-id=998 bgcolor=#d6d6d6
| 84998 ||  || — || December 27, 2003 || Socorro || LINEAR || TEL || align=right | 3.6 km || 
|-id=999 bgcolor=#E9E9E9
| 84999 ||  || — || December 27, 2003 || Haleakala || NEAT || — || align=right | 4.9 km || 
|-id=000 bgcolor=#E9E9E9
| 85000 ||  || — || December 27, 2003 || Črni Vrh || Črni Vrh || — || align=right | 4.2 km || 
|}

References

External links 
 Discovery Circumstances: Numbered Minor Planets (80001)–(85000) (IAU Minor Planet Center)

0084